= Marine life =

Organisms that live in salt water

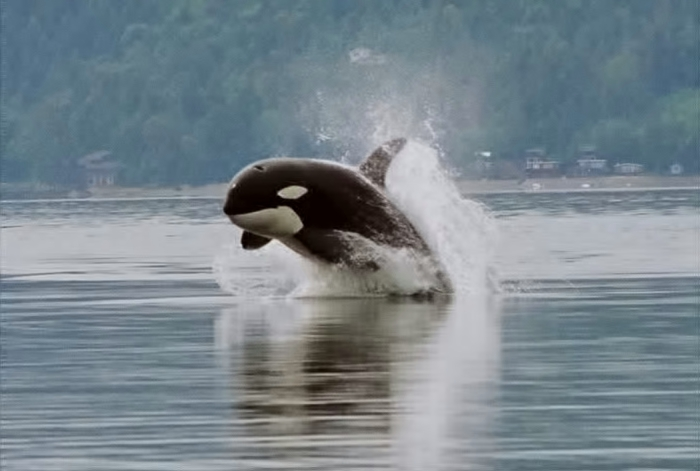
Killer whales (orcas) are highly visible marine apex predators that hunt many large species. However, most marine activity takes place among microscopic organisms that cannot be seen individually with the naked eye, such as marine bacteria and phytoplankton.

Marine life, which is also known as sea life or ocean life, refers to all the marine organisms that live in salt water habitats, or ecological communities that encompass all aquatic animals, plants, algae, fungi, protists, single-celled microorganisms and associated viruses living in the saline water of marine habitats, either the seawater of marginal seas and oceans, or the brackish water of coastal wetlands, lagoons, estuaries and inland seas. As of 2023, more than 242,000 marine species have been documented, and perhaps two million marine species are yet to be documented. On average, researchers describe about 2,300 new marine species each year. The study of marine life spans multiple fields, primarily marine biology, as well as biological oceanography.

By volume, oceans provide about 90% of the living space on Earth, and served as the cradle of life and vital biotic sanctuaries throughout Earth's geological history. The earliest known life forms evolved as anaerobic prokaryotes (archaea and bacteria) in the Archean oceans around the deep sea hydrothermal vents, before photoautotrophs appeared and allowed the microbial mats to expand into shallow water marine environments. The Great Oxygenation Event of the early Proterozoic significantly altered the marine chemistry, which likely caused a widespread anaerobe extinction event but also led to the evolution of eukaryotes through symbiogenesis between surviving anaerobes and aerobes. Complex life eventually arose out of marine eukaryotes during the Neoproterozoic, and which culminated in a large evolutionary radiation event of mostly sessile macrofaunae known as the Avalon Explosion. This was followed in the early Phanerozoic by a more prominent radiation event known as the Cambrian Explosion, where actively moving eumetazoan became prevalent. These marine life also expanded into fresh waters, where fungi and green algae that were washed ashore onto riparian areas started to take hold later during the Ordovician before rapidly expanding inland during the Silurian and Devonian, paving the way for terrestrial ecosystems to develop.

Today, marine species range in size from the microscopic phytoplankton, which can be as small as 0.02–micrometers; to huge cetaceans like the blue whale, which can reach 33 m (108 ft) in length. Marine microorganisms have been variously estimated as constituting about 70% or about 90% of the total marine biomass. Marine primary producers, mainly cyanobacteria and chloroplastic algae, produce oxygen and sequester carbon via photosynthesis, which generate enormous biomass and significantly influence the atmospheric chemistry. Migratory species, such as oceanodromous and anadromous fish, also create biomass and biological energy transfer between different regions of Earth, with many serving as keystone species of various ecosystems. At a fundamental level, marine life affects the nature of the planet, and in part, shape and protect shorelines, and some marine organisms (e.g. corals) even help create new land via accumulated reef-building.

Marine life can be roughly grouped into autotrophs and heterotrophs according to their roles within the food web: the former include photosynthetic and the much rarer chemosynthetic organisms (chemoautotrophs) that can convert inorganic molecules into organic compounds using energy from sunlight or exothermic oxidation, such as cyanobacteria, iron-oxidizing bacteria, algae (seaweeds and various microalgae) and seagrass; the latter include all the rest that must feed on other organisms to acquire nutrients and energy, which include animals, fungi, protists and non-photosynthetic microorganisms. Marine animals are further informally divided into marine vertebrates and marine invertebrates, both of which are polyphyletic groupings with the former including all saltwater fish, marine mammals, marine reptiles and seabirds, and the latter include all that are not considered vertebrates. Generally, marine vertebrates are much more nektonic and metabolically demanding of oxygen and nutrients, often suffering distress or even mass deaths (a.k.a. "fish kills") during anoxic events, while marine invertebrates are a lot more hypoxia-tolerant and exhibit a wide range of morphological and physiological modifications to survive in poorly oxygenated waters.

== Water ==
Elevation histogram showing the percentage of the Earth's surface above and below sea level

There is no life without water. It has been described as the universal solvent for its ability to dissolve many substances, and as the solvent of life. Water is the only common substance to exist as a solid, liquid, and gas under conditions normal to life on Earth. The Nobel Prize winner Albert Szent-Györgyi referred to water as the mater und matrix: the mother and womb of life.

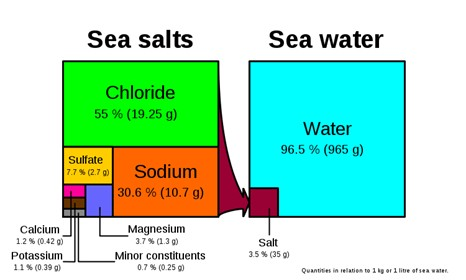
Composition of seawater. Quantities in relation to 1 kg or 1 litre of sea water.

The abundance of surface water on Earth is a unique feature in the Solar System. Earth's hydrosphere consists chiefly of the oceans but technically includes all water surfaces in the world, including inland seas, lakes, rivers, and underground waters down to a depth of 2,000 metres (6,600 ft). The deepest underwater location is Challenger Deep of the Mariana Trench in the Pacific Ocean, having a depth of 10,900 metres (35,800 ft). (Note: This is the measurement taken by the vessel Kaikō in March 1995 and is considered the most accurate measurement to date. See the Challenger Deep article for more details.)

Conventionally, the planet is divided into five separate oceans, but these oceans all connect into a single world ocean. The mass of this world ocean is 1.35×10^{18} metric tons or about 1/4400 of Earth's total mass. The world ocean covers an area of 3.618×10^{8} km^{2} with a mean depth of 3682 m, resulting in an estimated volume of 1.332×10^{9} km^{3}. If all of Earth's crustal surface was at the same elevation as a smooth sphere, the depth of the resulting world ocean would be about 2.7 kilometres (1.7 mi).

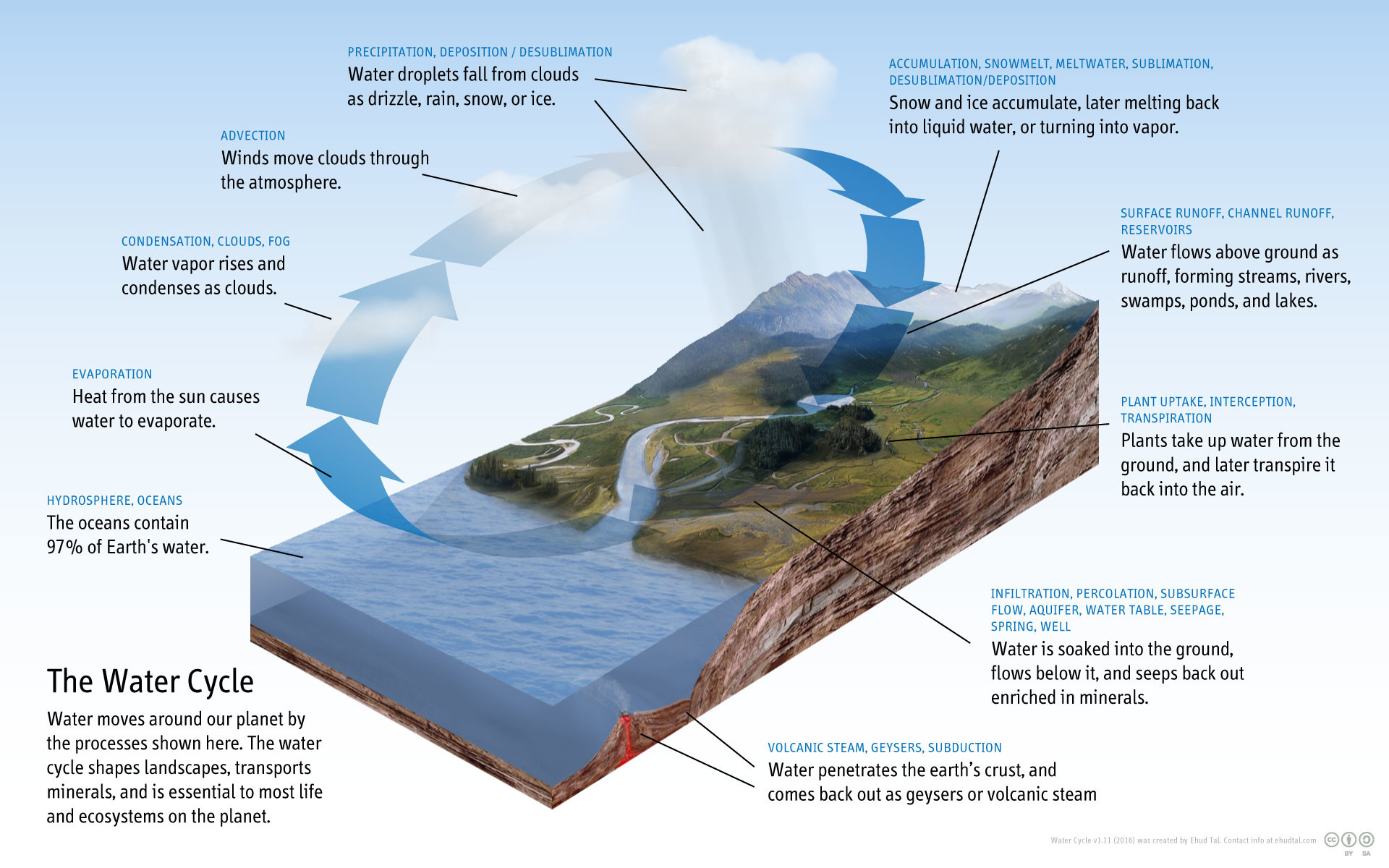
The Earth's water cycle

About 97.5% of the water on Earth is saline; the remaining 2.5% is fresh water. Most fresh water – about 69% – is present as ice in ice caps and glaciers. The average salinity of Earth's oceans is about 35 grams (1.2 oz) of salt per kilogram of seawater (3.5% salt). Most of the salt in the ocean comes from the weathering and erosion of rocks on land. Some salts are released from volcanic activity or extracted from cool igneous rocks.

The oceans are also a reservoir of dissolved atmospheric gases, which are essential for the survival of many aquatic life forms. Sea water has an important influence on the world's climate, with the oceans acting as a large heat reservoir. Shifts in the oceanic temperature distribution can cause significant weather shifts, such as the El Niño-Southern Oscillation.

Altogether the ocean occupies 71 percent of the world surface, averaging nearly 3.7 kilometres (2.3 mi) in depth. By volume, the ocean provides about 90 percent of the living space on the planet. The science fiction writer Arthur C. Clarke has pointed out it would be more appropriate to refer to planet Earth as planet Ocean.

However, water is found elsewhere in the Solar System. Europa, one of the moons orbiting Jupiter, is slightly smaller than the Earth's Moon. There is a strong possibility a large saltwater ocean exists beneath its ice surface. It has been estimated the outer crust of solid ice is about 10–30 km (6.2–18.6 mi) thick and the liquid ocean underneath is about 100 km (62 mi) deep. This would make Europa's ocean over twice the volume of the Earth's ocean. There has been speculation Europa's ocean could support life, and could be capable of supporting multicellular microorganisms if hydrothermal vents are active on the ocean floor. Enceladus, a small icy moon of Saturn, also has what appears to be an underground ocean which actively vents warm water from the moon's surface.

== Evolution ==
Life timeline
← / Earth formed; ← / Earliest water; ← / LUCA; ← / Earliest fossils; ← / Great Oxygenation Event; ← / Sexual reproduction; ← / Earliest fungi; ← / Neoproterozoic oxygenation event; ← / Ediacaran biota; ← / Cambrian explosion; ← / Earliest tetrapods; ← / Earliest hominoid
(million years ago)

=== Historical development ===
The Earth is about 4.54 billion years old. The earliest undisputed evidence of life on Earth dates from at least 3.5 billion years ago, during the Eoarchean era after a geological crust started to solidify following the earlier molten Hadean Eon. Microbial mat fossils have been found in 3.48 billion-year-old sandstone in Western Australia. Other early physical evidence of a biogenic substance is graphite in 3.7 billion-year-old metasedimentary rocks discovered in Western Greenland as well as "remains of biotic life" found in 4.1 billion-year-old rocks in Western Australia. According to one of the researchers, "If life arose relatively quickly on Earth ... then it could be common in the universe."

All organisms on Earth are descended from a common ancestor or ancestral gene pool. Highly energetic chemistry is thought to have produced a self-replicating molecule around 4 billion years ago, and half a billion years later the last common ancestor of all life existed. The current scientific consensus is that the complex biochemistry that makes up life came from simpler chemical reactions. The beginning of life may have included self-replicating molecules such as RNA and the assembly of simple cells. In 2016 scientists reported a set of 355 genes from the last universal common ancestor (LUCA) of all life, including microorganisms, living on Earth.

Current species are a stage in the process of evolution, with their diversity the product of a long series of speciation and extinction events. The common descent of organisms was first deduced from four simple facts about organisms: First, they have geographic distributions that cannot be explained by local adaptation. Second, the diversity of life is not a set of unique organisms, but organisms that share morphological similarities. Third, vestigial traits with no clear purpose resemble functional ancestral traits and finally, that organisms can be classified using these similarities into a hierarchy of nested groups—similar to a family tree. However, modern research has suggested that, due to horizontal gene transfer, this "tree of life" may be more complicated than a simple branching tree since some genes have spread independently between distantly related species.

Past species have also left records of their evolutionary history. Fossils, along with the comparative anatomy of present-day organisms, constitute the morphological, or anatomical, record. By comparing the anatomies of both modern and extinct species, paleontologists can infer the lineages of those species. However, this approach is most successful for organisms that had hard body parts, such as shells, bones or teeth. Further, as prokaryotes such as bacteria and archaea share a limited set of common morphologies, their fossils do not provide information on their ancestry.

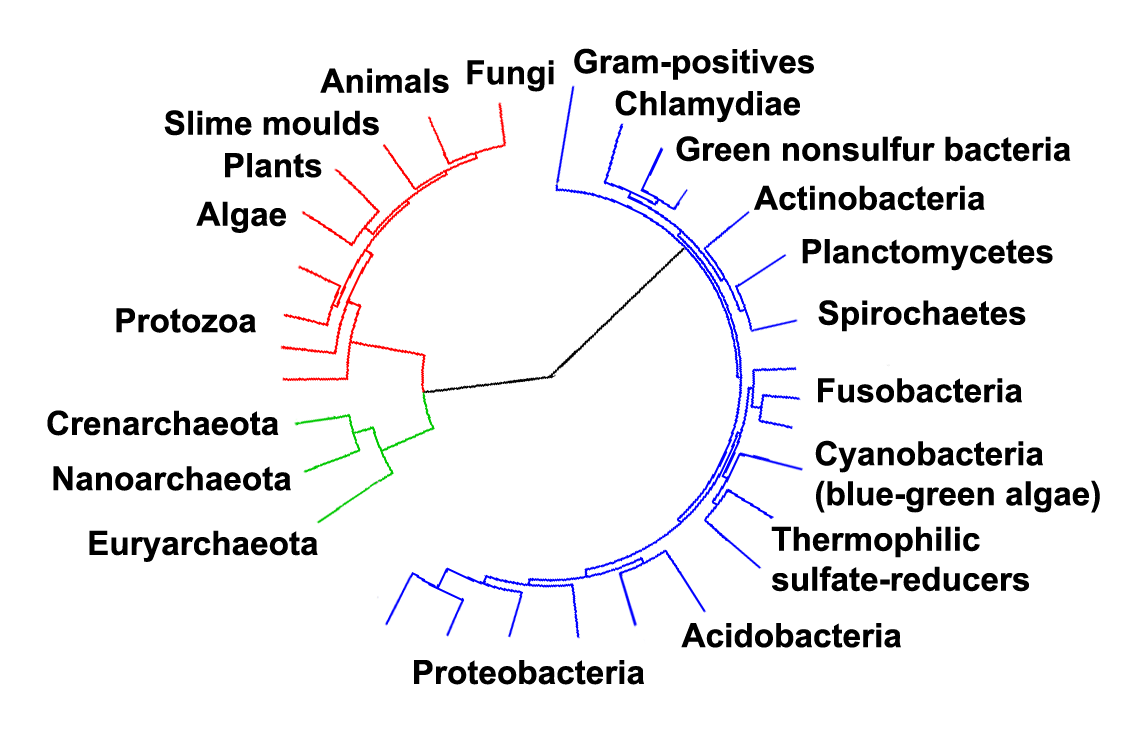
Evolutionary tree showing the divergence of modern species from their common ancestor in the centre. The three domains are coloured, with bacteria blue, archaea green and eukaryotes red.

More recently, evidence for common descent has come from the study of biochemical similarities between organisms. For example, all living cells use the same basic set of nucleotides and amino acids. The development of molecular genetics has revealed the record of evolution left in organisms' genomes: dating when species diverged through the molecular clock produced by mutations. For example, these DNA sequence comparisons have revealed that humans and chimpanzees share 98% of their genomes and analyzing the few areas where they differ helps shed light on when the common ancestor of these species existed.

Prokaryotes inhabited the Earth from approximately 3–4 billion years ago. No obvious changes in morphology or cellular organization occurred in these organisms over the next few billion years. The eukaryotic cells emerged between 1.6 and 2.7 billion years ago. The next major change in cell structure came when bacteria were engulfed by eukaryotic cells, in a cooperative association called endosymbiosis. The engulfed bacteria and the host cell then underwent coevolution, with the bacteria evolving into either mitochondria or hydrogenosomes. Another engulfment of cyanobacterial-like organisms led to the formation of chloroplasts in algae and plants.

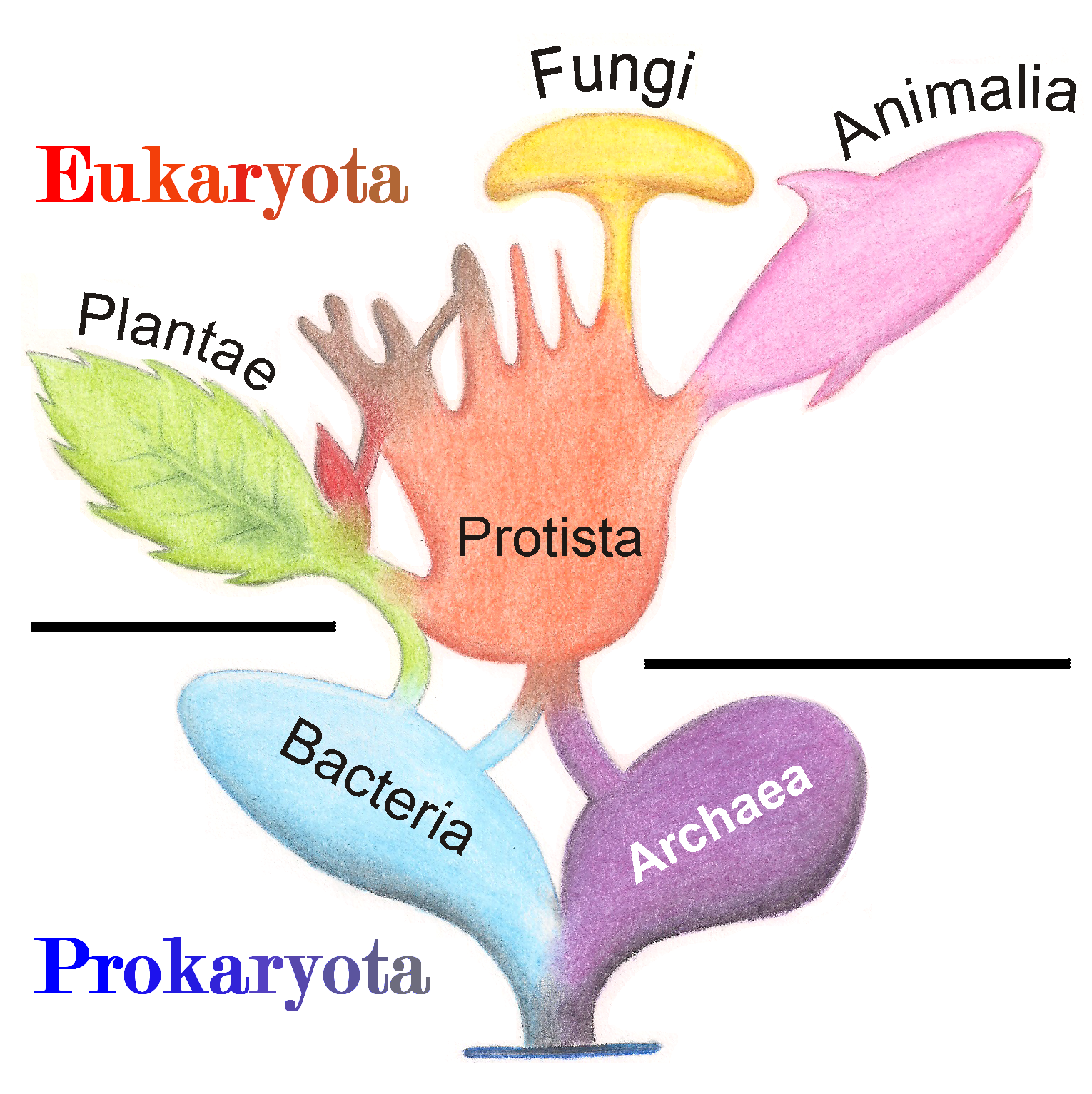
Phylogenetic and symbiogenetic tree of living organisms, showing a view of the origins of eukaryotes and prokaryotes

The history of life was that of the unicellular eukaryotes, prokaryotes and archaea until about 610 million years ago when multicellular organisms began to appear in the oceans in the Ediacaran period. The evolution of multicellularity occurred in multiple independent events, in organisms as diverse as sponges, brown algae, cyanobacteria, slime moulds and myxobacteria. In 2016 scientists reported that, about 800 million years ago, a minor genetic change in a single molecule called GK-PID may have allowed organisms to go from a single cell organism to one of many cells.

Soon after the emergence of these first multicellular organisms, a remarkable amount of biological diversity appeared over a span of about 10 million years, in an event called the Cambrian explosion. Here, the majority of types of modern animals appeared in the fossil record, as well as unique lineages that subsequently became extinct. Various triggers for the Cambrian explosion have been proposed, including the accumulation of oxygen in the atmosphere from photosynthesis.

About 500 million years ago, plants and fungi started colonizing the land. Evidence for the appearance of the first land plants occurs in the Ordovician, around 450 million years ago, in the form of fossil spores. Land plants began to diversify in the Late Silurian, from around 430 million years ago. The colonization of the land by plants was soon followed by arthropods and other animals. Insects were particularly successful and even today make up the majority of animal species. Amphibians first appeared around 364 million years ago, followed by early amniotes and birds around 155 million years ago (both from "reptile"-like lineages), mammals around 129 million years ago, homininae around 10 million years ago and modern humans around 250,000 years ago. However, despite the evolution of these large animals, smaller organisms similar to the types that evolved early in this process continue to be highly successful and dominate the Earth, with the majority of both biomass and species being prokaryotes.

Estimates on the number of Earth's current species range from 10 million to 14 million, of which about 1.2 million have been documented and over 86 percent have not yet been described.

== Microorganisms ==
microbial mats

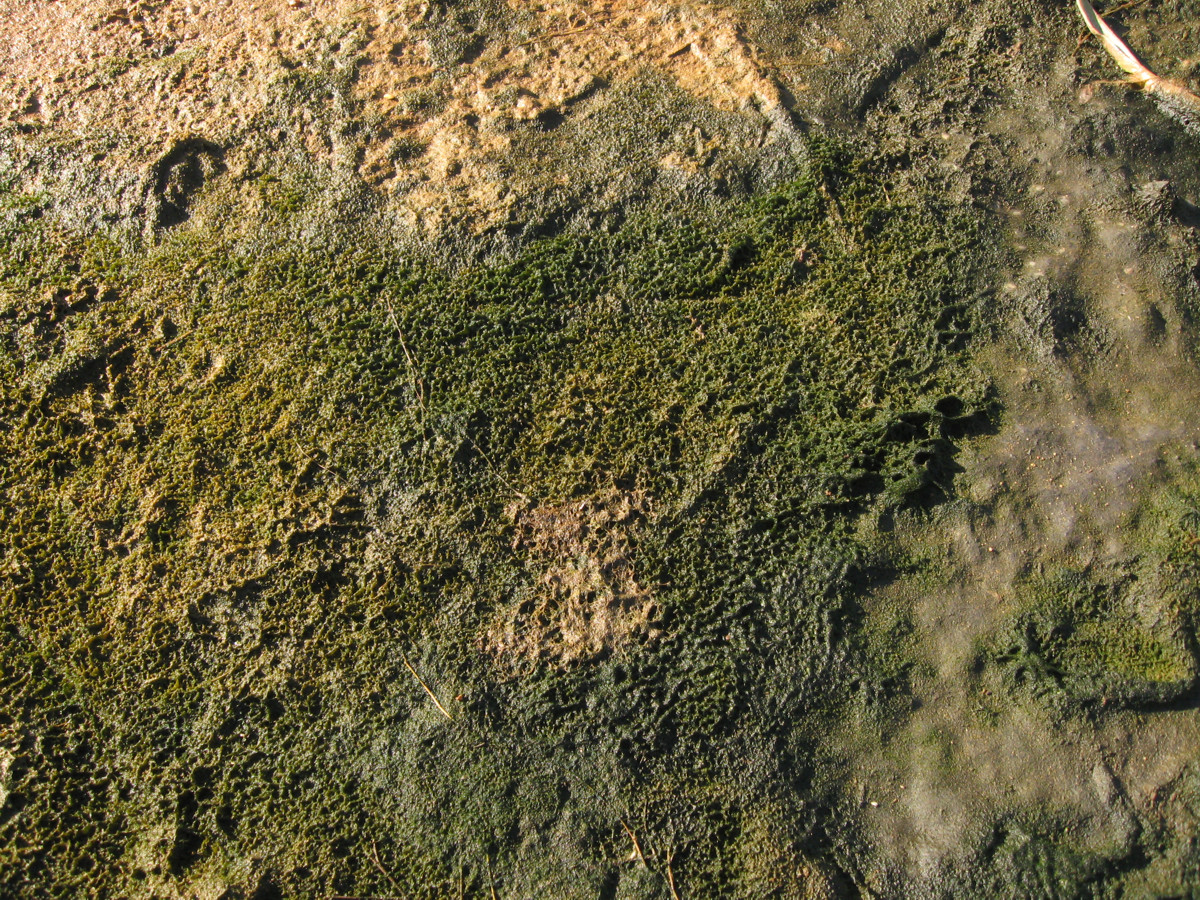
Microbial mats are the earliest form of life on Earth for which there is good fossil evidence. The image shows a cyanobacterial-algal mat.

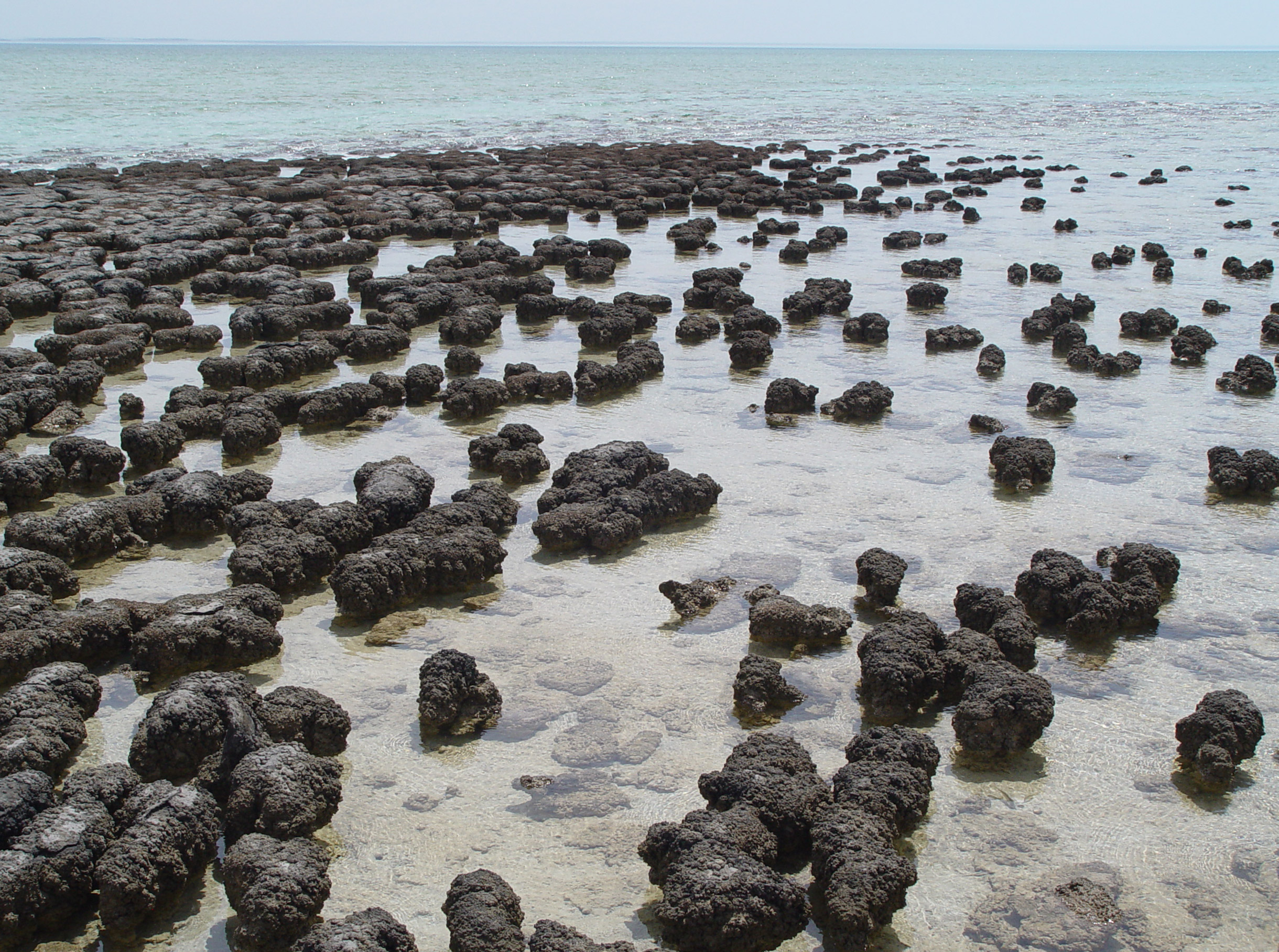
Stromatolites are formed from microbial mats as microbes slowly move upwards to avoid being smothered by sediment.

Microorganisms make up about 70% of the marine biomass. A microorganism, or microbe, is a microscopic organism too small to be recognized with the naked eye. It can be single-celled or multicellular. Microorganisms are diverse and include all bacteria and archaea, most protozoa such as algae, fungi, and certain microscopic animals such as rotifers.

Many macroscopic animals and plants have microscopic juvenile stages. Some microbiologists also classify viruses (and viroids) as microorganisms, but others consider these as nonliving.

Microorganisms are crucial to nutrient recycling in ecosystems as they act as decomposers. Some microorganisms are pathogenic, causing disease and even death in plants and animals. As inhabitants of the largest environment on Earth, microbial marine systems drive changes in every global system. Microbes are responsible for virtually all the photosynthesis that occurs in the ocean, as well as the cycling of carbon, nitrogen, phosphorus, other nutrients and trace elements.

The range of sizes shown by prokaryotes (bacteria and archaea) and viruses relative to those of other organisms and biomolecules

- Marine microorganisms
  - Viruses
  - Cellular life
    - Prokaryotes
      - Bacteria
      - Archaea
    - Eukaryotes
      - Protists
      - Microfungi
      - Microanimals

Microscopic life undersea is diverse and still poorly understood, such as for the role of viruses in marine ecosystems. Most marine viruses are bacteriophages, which are harmless to plants and animals, but are essential to the regulation of saltwater and freshwater ecosystems. They infect and destroy bacteria in aquatic microbial communities, and are the most important mechanism of recycling carbon in the marine environment. The organic molecules released from the dead bacterial cells stimulate fresh bacterial and algal growth. Viral activity may also contribute to the biological pump, the process whereby carbon is sequestered in the deep ocean.

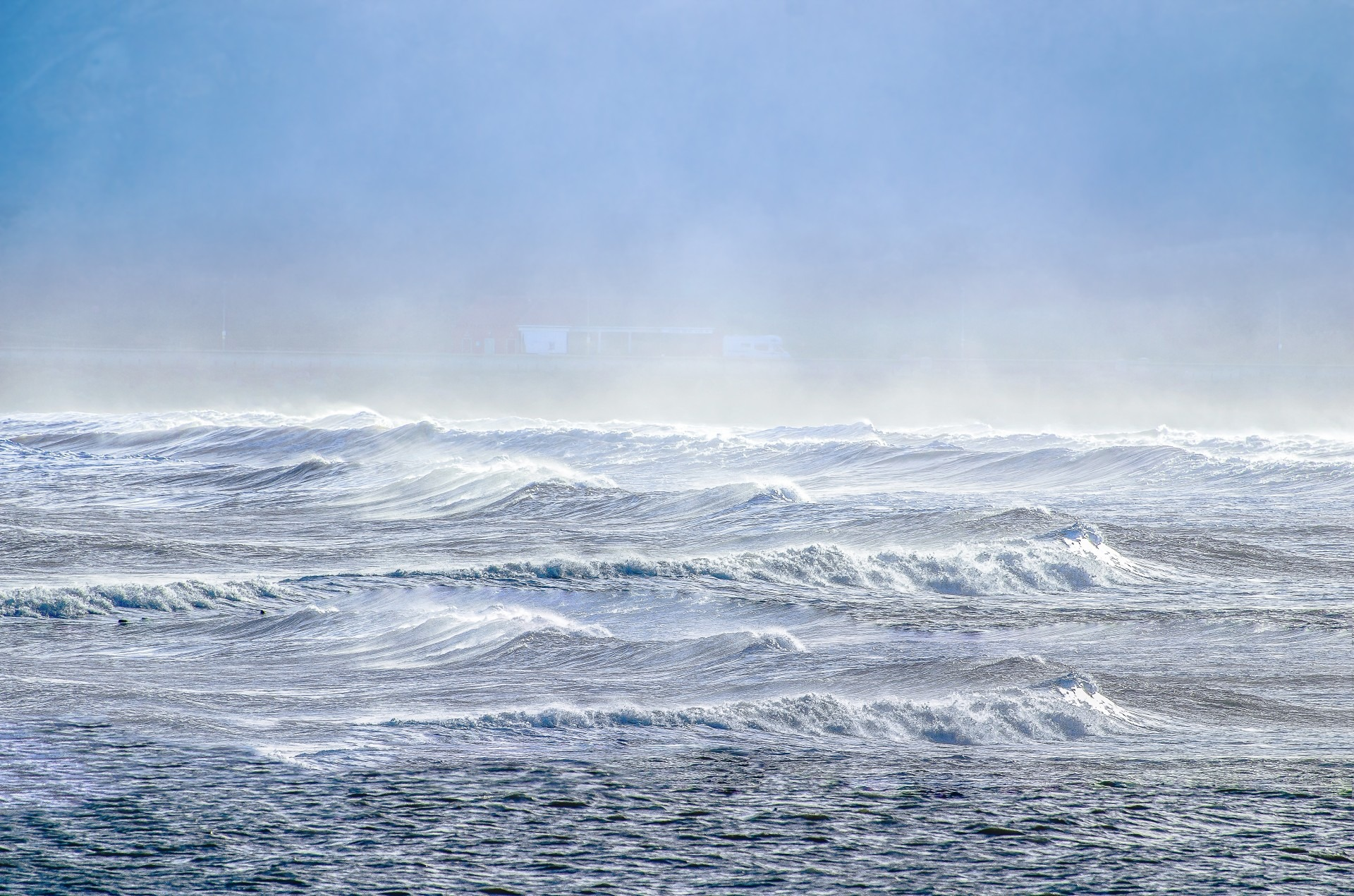
Sea spray containing marine microorganisms can be swept high into the atmosphere where they become aeroplankton, and can travel the globe before falling back to earth.

A stream of airborne microorganisms circles the planet above weather systems but below commercial air lanes. Some peripatetic microorganisms are swept up from terrestrial dust storms, but most originate from marine microorganisms in sea spray. In 2018, scientists reported that hundreds of millions of viruses and tens of millions of bacteria are deposited daily on every square meter around the planet.

Microscopic organisms live throughout the biosphere. The mass of prokaryote microorganisms – which includes bacteria and archaea, but not the nucleated eukaryote microorganisms — may be as much as 0.8 trillion tons of carbon (of the total biosphere mass, estimated at between 1 and 4 trillion tons). Single-celled barophilic marine microbes have been found at a depth of 10,900 m (35,800 ft) in the Mariana Trench, the deepest spot in the Earth's oceans. Microorganisms live inside rocks 580 m (1,900 ft) below the sea floor under 2,590 m (8,500 ft) of ocean off the coast of the northwestern United States, as well as 2,400 m (7,900 ft; 1.5 mi) beneath the seabed off Japan. The greatest known temperature at which microbial life can exist is 122 °C (252 °F) (Methanopyrus kandleri). In 2014, scientists confirmed the existence of microorganisms living 800 m (2,600 ft) below the ice of Antarctica. According to one researcher, "You can find microbes everywhere – they're extremely adaptable to conditions, and survive wherever they are."

=== Marine viruses ===
Viruses are small infectious agents that do not have their own metabolism and can replicate only inside the living cells of other organisms. Viruses can infect all types of life forms, from animals and plants to microorganisms, including bacteria and archaea. The linear size of the average virus is about one one-hundredth that of the average bacterium. Most viruses cannot be seen with an optical microscope so electron microscopes are used instead.

Viruses are found wherever there is life and have probably existed since living cells first evolved. The origin of viruses is unclear because they do not form fossils, so molecular techniques have been used to compare the DNA or RNA of viruses and are a useful means of investigating how they arise.

Viruses are now recognized as ancient and as having origins that pre-date the divergence of life into the three domains. But the origins of viruses in the evolutionary history of life are unclear: some may have evolved from plasmids—pieces of DNA that can move between cells—while others may have evolved from bacteria. In evolution, viruses are an important means of horizontal gene transfer, which increases genetic diversity.

Bacteriophages (phages)

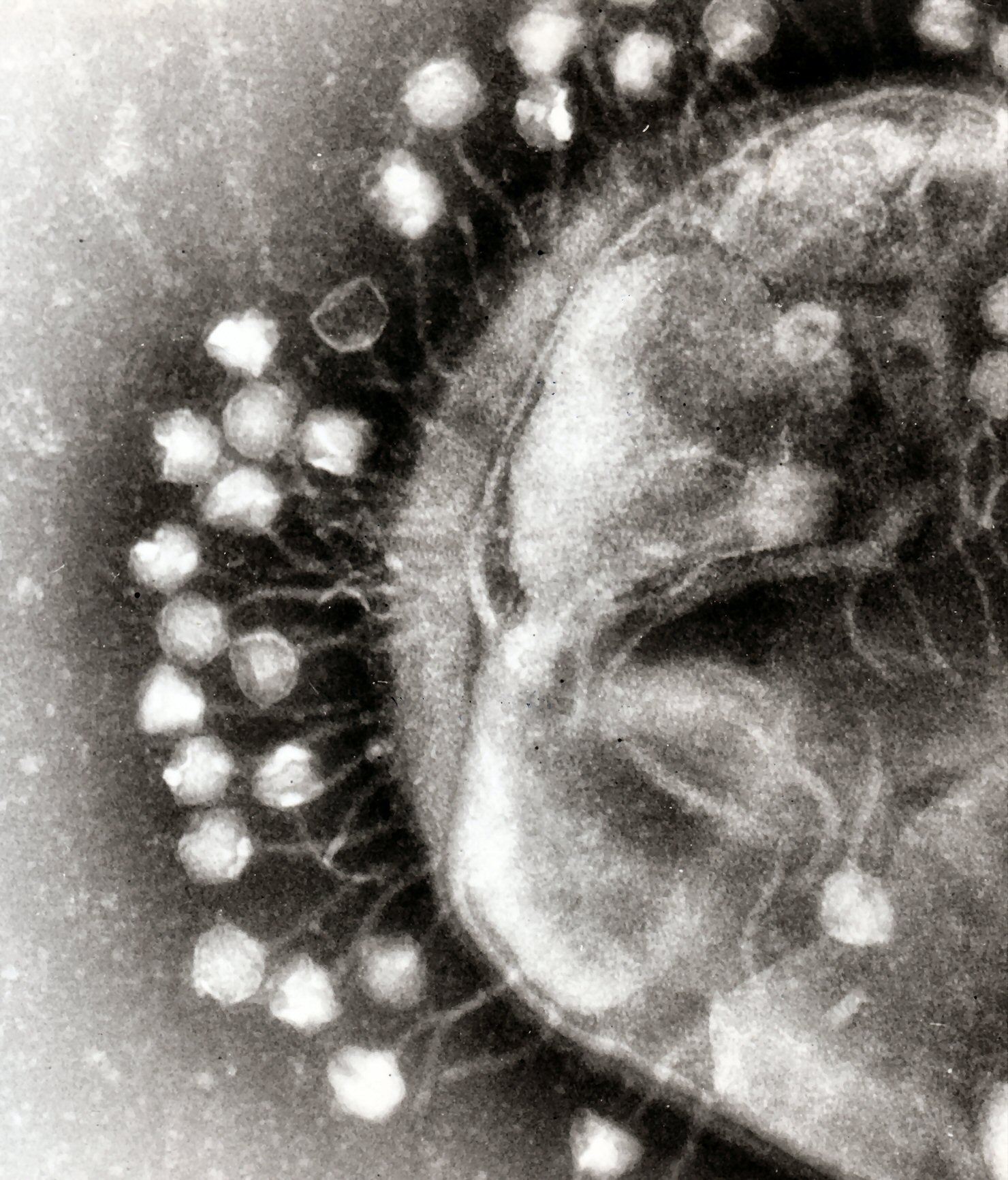
Multiple phages attached to a bacterial cell wall at 200,000× magnification

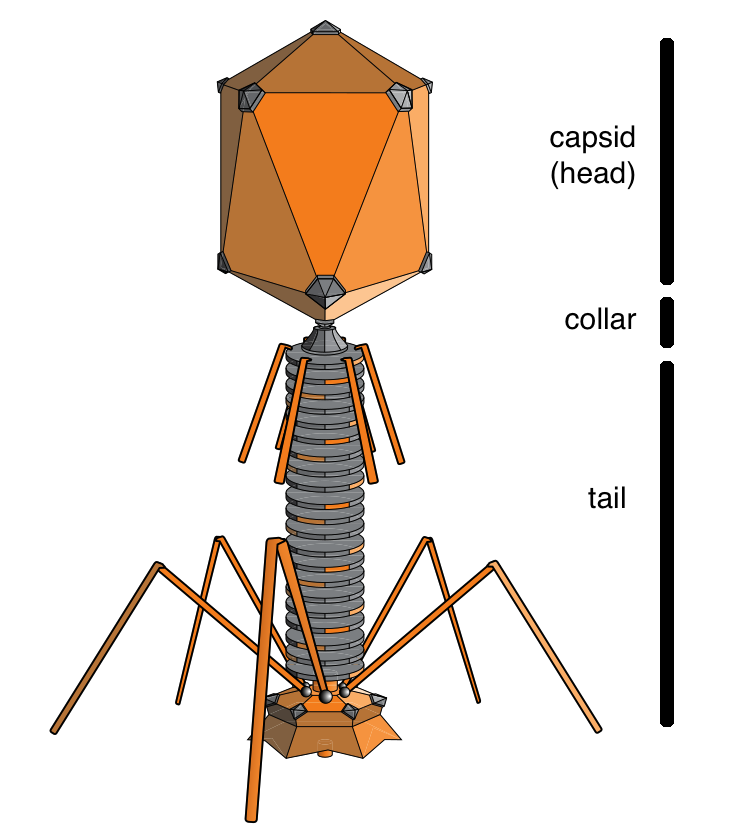
Diagram of a typical tailed phage

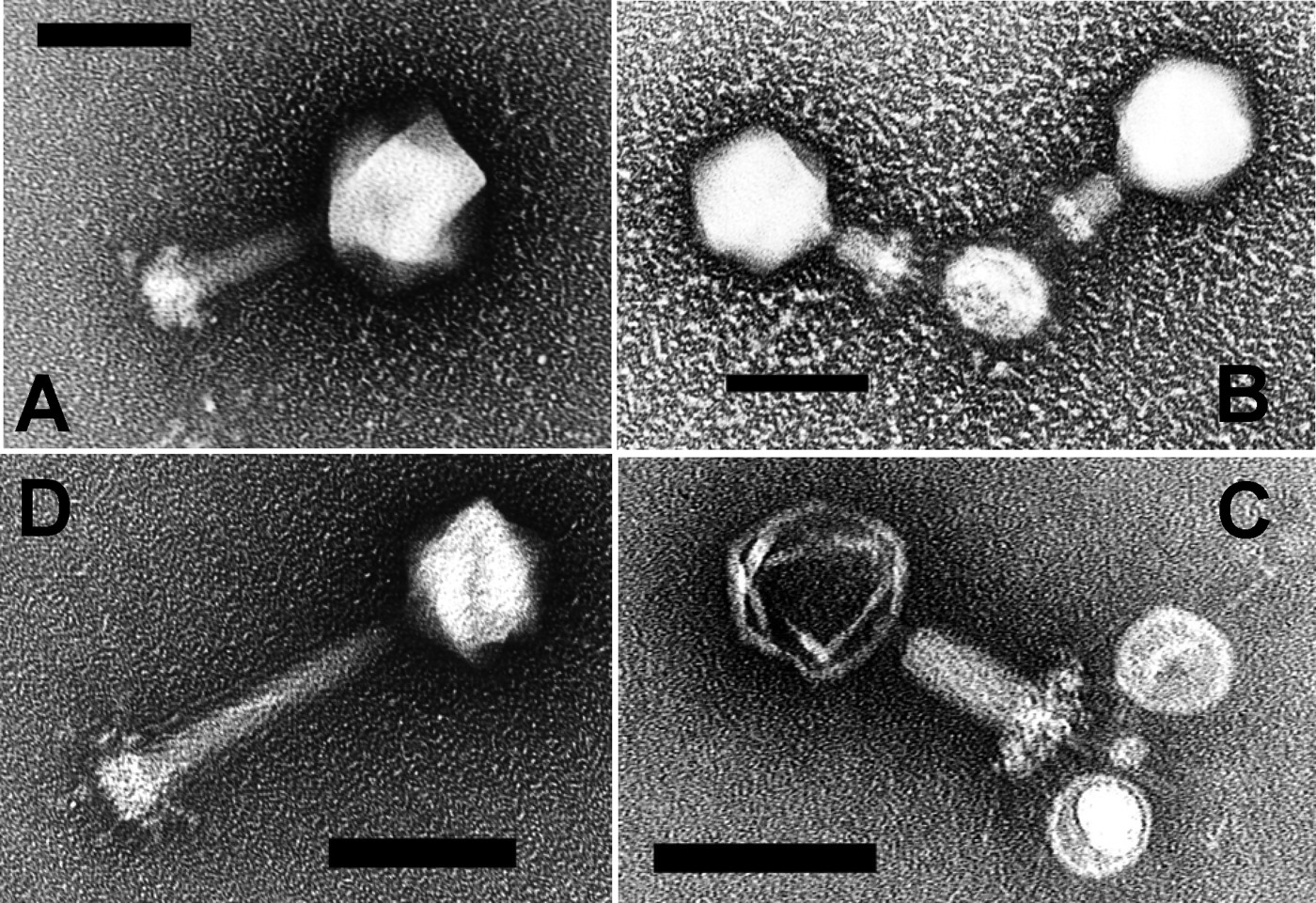
These are cyanophages, viruses that infect cyanobacteria (scale bars indicate 100 nm)

Opinions differ on whether viruses are a form of life or organic structures that interact with living organisms. They are considered by some to be a life form, because they carry genetic material, reproduce by creating multiple copies of themselves through self-assembly, and evolve through natural selection. However they lack key characteristics such as a cellular structure generally considered necessary to count as life. Because they possess some but not all such qualities, viruses have been described as replicators and as "organisms at the edge of life".

Bacteriophages, often just called phages, are viruses that parasite bacteria and archaea. Marine phages parasite marine bacteria and archaea, such as cyanobacteria. They are a common and diverse group of viruses and are the most abundant biological entity in marine environments, because their hosts, bacteria, are typically the numerically dominant cellular life in the sea. Generally there are about 1 million to 10 million viruses in each mL of seawater, or about ten times more double-stranded DNA viruses than there are cellular organisms, although estimates of viral abundance in seawater can vary over a wide range. Tailed bacteriophages appear to dominate marine ecosystems in number and diversity of organisms. Bacteriophages belonging to the families Corticoviridae, Inoviridae and Microviridae are also known to infect diverse marine bacteria.

Microorganisms make up about 70% of the marine biomass. It is estimated viruses kill 20% of this biomass each day and that there are 15 times as many viruses in the oceans as there are bacteria and archaea. Viruses are the main agents responsible for the rapid destruction of harmful algal blooms, which often kill other marine life. The number of viruses in the oceans decreases further offshore and deeper into the water, where there are fewer host organisms.

There are also archaeal viruses which replicate within archaea: these are double-stranded DNA viruses with unusual and sometimes unique shapes. These viruses have been studied in most detail in the thermophilic archaea, particularly the orders Sulfolobales and Thermoproteales.

Viruses are an important natural means of transferring genes between different species, which increases genetic diversity and drives evolution. It is thought that viruses played a central role in the early evolution, before the diversification of bacteria, archaea and eukaryotes, at the time of the last universal common ancestor of life on Earth. Viruses are still one of the largest reservoirs of unexplored genetic diversity on Earth.

=== Marine bacteria ===
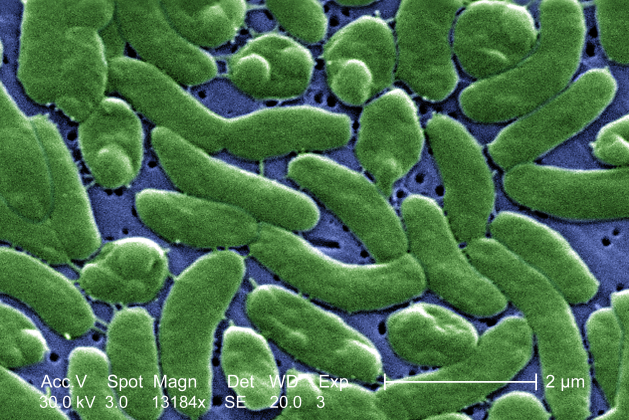
Vibrio vulnificus, a virulent bacterium found in estuaries and along coastal areas

Bacteria constitute a large domain of prokaryotic microorganisms. Typically a few micrometers in length, bacteria have a number of shapes, ranging from spheres to rods and spirals. Bacteria were among the first life forms to appear on Earth, and are present in most of its habitats. Bacteria inhabit soil, water, acidic hot springs, radioactive waste, and the deep portions of Earth's crust. Bacteria also live in symbiotic and parasitic relationships with plants and animals.

Once regarded as plants constituting the class Schizomycetes, bacteria are now classified as prokaryotes. Unlike cells of animals and other eukaryotes, bacterial cells do not contain a nucleus and rarely harbor membrane-bound organelles. Although the term bacteria traditionally included all prokaryotes, the scientific classification changed after the discovery in the 1990s that prokaryotes consist of two very different groups of organisms that evolved from an ancient common ancestor. These evolutionary domains are called Bacteria and Archaea.

The ancestors of modern bacteria were unicellular microorganisms that were the first forms of life to appear on Earth, about 4 billion years ago. For about 3 billion years, most organisms were microscopic, and bacteria and archaea were the dominant forms of life. Although bacterial fossils exist, such as stromatolites, their lack of distinctive morphology prevents them from being used to examine the history of bacterial evolution, or to date the time of origin of a particular bacterial species. However, gene sequences can be used to reconstruct the bacterial phylogeny, and these studies indicate that bacteria diverged first from the archaeal/eukaryotic lineage. Bacteria were also involved in the second great evolutionary divergence, that of the archaea and eukaryotes. Here, eukaryotes resulted from the entering of ancient bacteria into endosymbiotic associations with the ancestors of eukaryotic cells, which were themselves possibly related to the Archaea. This involved the engulfment by proto-eukaryotic cells of alphaproteobacterial symbionts to form either mitochondria or hydrogenosomes, which are still found in all known Eukarya. Later on, some eukaryotes that already contained mitochondria also engulfed cyanobacterial-like organisms. This led to the formation of chloroplasts in algae and plants. There are also some algae that originated from even later endosymbiotic events. Here, eukaryotes engulfed a eukaryotic algae that developed into a "second-generation" plastid. This is known as secondary endosymbiosis.

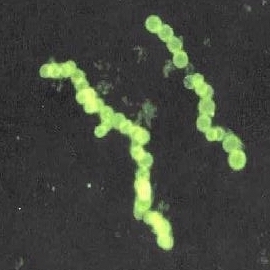
The marine Thiomargarita namibiensis, the largest known bacterium

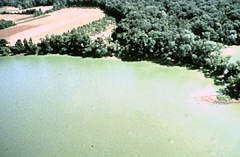
Cyanobacteria blooms can contain lethal cyanotoxins.

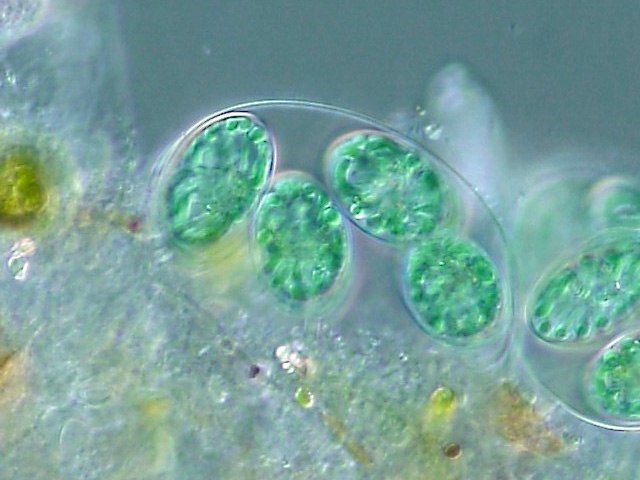
The chloroplasts of glaucophytes have a peptidoglycan layer, evidence suggesting their endosymbiotic origin from cyanobacteria.

The largest known bacterium, the marine Thiomargarita namibiensis, can be visible to the naked eye and sometimes attains 0.75 mm (750 μm).

=== Marine archaea ===
The archaea (Greek for ancient) constitute a domain and kingdom of single-celled microorganisms. These microbes are prokaryotes, meaning they have no cell nucleus or any other membrane-bound organelles in their cells.

Archaea were initially classified as bacteria, but this classification is outdated. Archaeal cells have unique properties separating them from the other two domains of life, Bacteria and Eukaryota. The Archaea are further divided into multiple recognized phyla. Classification is difficult because the majority have not been isolated in the laboratory and have only been detected by analysis of their nucleic acids in samples from their environment.

Archaea and bacteria are generally similar in size and shape, although a few archaea have very strange shapes, such as the flat and square-shaped cells of Haloquadratum walsbyi. Despite this morphological similarity to bacteria, archaea possess genes and several metabolic pathways that are more closely related to those of eukaryotes, notably the enzymes involved in transcription and translation. Other aspects of archaeal biochemistry are unique, such as their reliance on ether lipids in their cell membranes, such as archaeols. Archaea use more energy sources than eukaryotes: these range from organic compounds, such as sugars, to ammonia, metal ions or even hydrogen gas. Salt-tolerant archaea (the Haloarchaea) use sunlight as an energy source, and other species of archaea fix carbon; however, unlike plants and cyanobacteria, no known species of archaea does both. Archaea reproduce asexually by binary fission, fragmentation, or budding; unlike bacteria and eukaryotes, no known species forms spores.

Archaea are particularly numerous in the oceans, and the archaea in plankton may be one of the most abundant groups of organisms on the planet. Archaea are a major part of Earth's life and may play roles in both the carbon cycle and the nitrogen cycle.

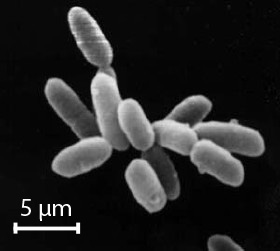
Halobacteria, found in water near saturated with salt, are now recognized as archaea.

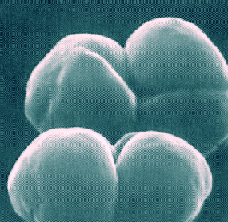
Methanosarcina barkeri, a marine archaea that produces methane

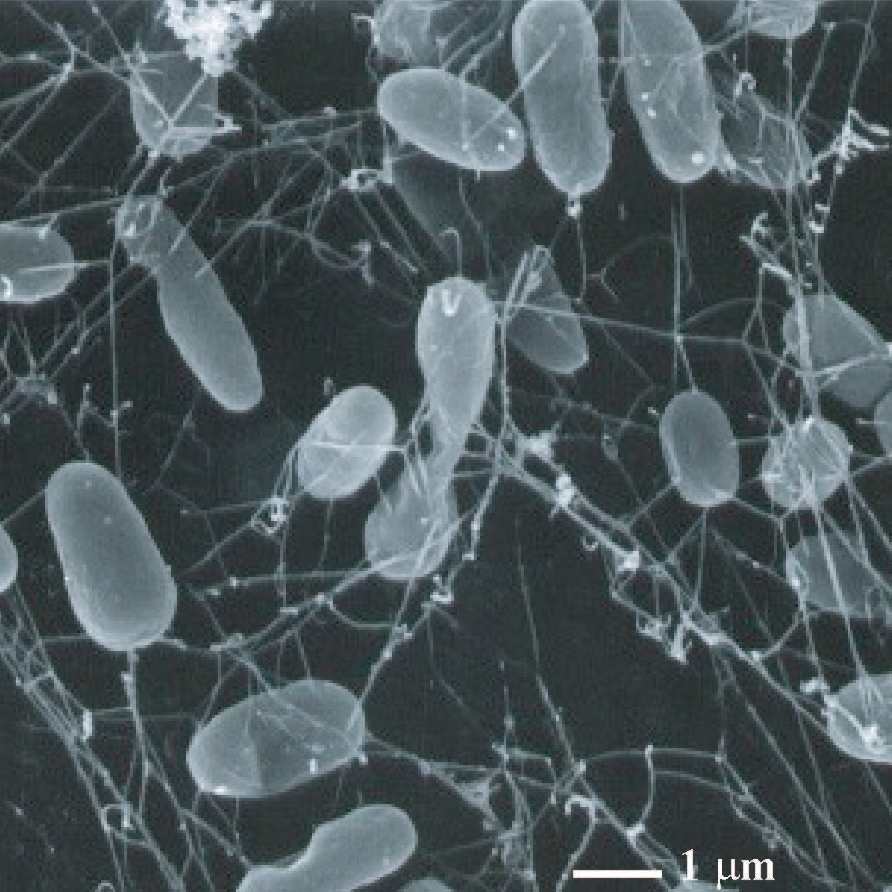
Thermophiles, such as Pyrolobus fumarii, survive well over 100 °C.

=== Marine protists ===
Protists are eukaryotes that cannot be classified as plants, fungi or animals. They are usually single-celled and microscopic. Life originated as single-celled prokaryotes (bacteria and archaea) and later evolved into more complex eukaryotes. Eukaryotes are the more developed life forms known as plants, animals, fungi and protists. The term protist came into use historically as a term of convenience for eukaryotes that cannot be strictly classified as plants, animals or fungi. They are not a part of modern cladistics, because they are paraphyletic (lacking a common ancestor). Protists can be broadly divided into four groups depending on whether their nutrition is plant-like, animal-like, fungus-like, or a mixture of these.

Protists according to how they get food
Type of protist		Description	Example	Other examples
Plant-like	Algae (see below)	Autotrophic protists that make their own food without needing to consume other organisms, usually by using photosynthesis	Red algae, Cyanidium sp.	Green algae, brown algae, diatoms and some dinoflagellates. Plant-like protists are important components of phytoplankton discussed below.
Animal-like	Protozoans	Heterotrophic protists that get their food consuming other organisms	Radiolarian protist as drawn by Haeckel	Foraminiferans, and some marine amoebae, ciliates and flagellates.
Fungus-like	Slime moulds and slime nets	Saprotrophic protists that get their food from the remains of organisms that have broken down and decayed	Marine slime nets form labyrinthine networks of tubes in which amoeba without pseudopods can travel	Marine lichen
Mixotropes	Various	Mixotrophic and osmotrophic protists that get their food from a combination of the above	Euglena mutabilis, a photosynthetic flagellate	Many marine mixotrophs are found among protists, including among ciliates, Rhizaria and dinoflagellates

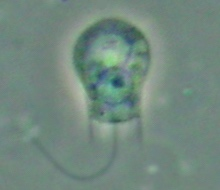
micrograph

cell schematic

Choanoflagellates, unicellular "collared" flagellate protists, are thought to be the closest living relatives of the animals.

Getting to know our single-celled ancestors - MicroCosmos

Protists are highly diverse organisms currently organized into 18 phyla, but are not easy to classify. Studies have shown high protist diversity exists in oceans, deep sea-vents and river sediments, suggesting a large number of eukaryotic microbial communities have yet to be discovered. Recent studies in marine environments found mixotrophic protests contribute a significant part of the protist biomass.

Single-celled and microscopic protists

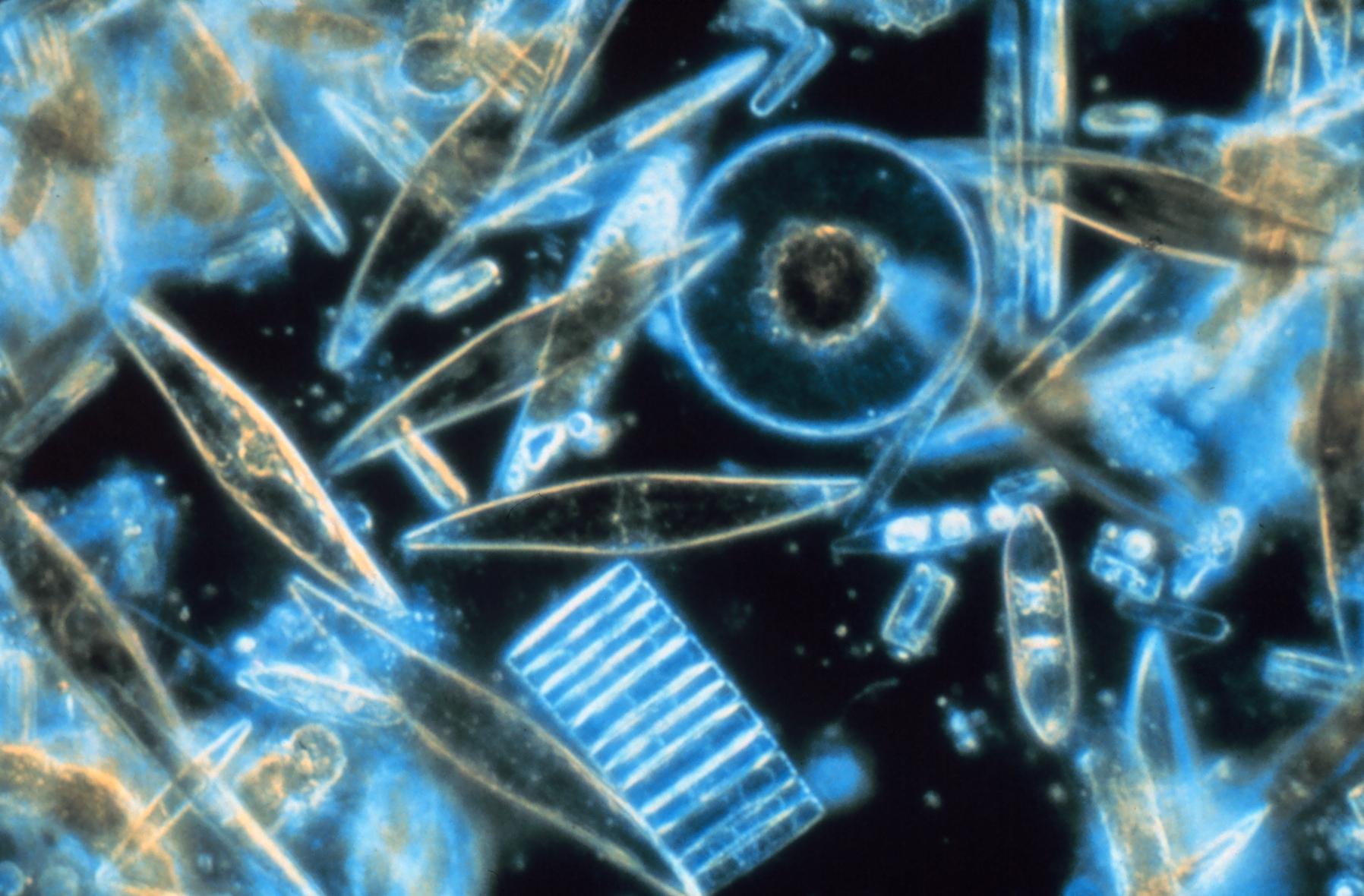
Diatoms are a major algae group generating about 20% of world oxygen production.

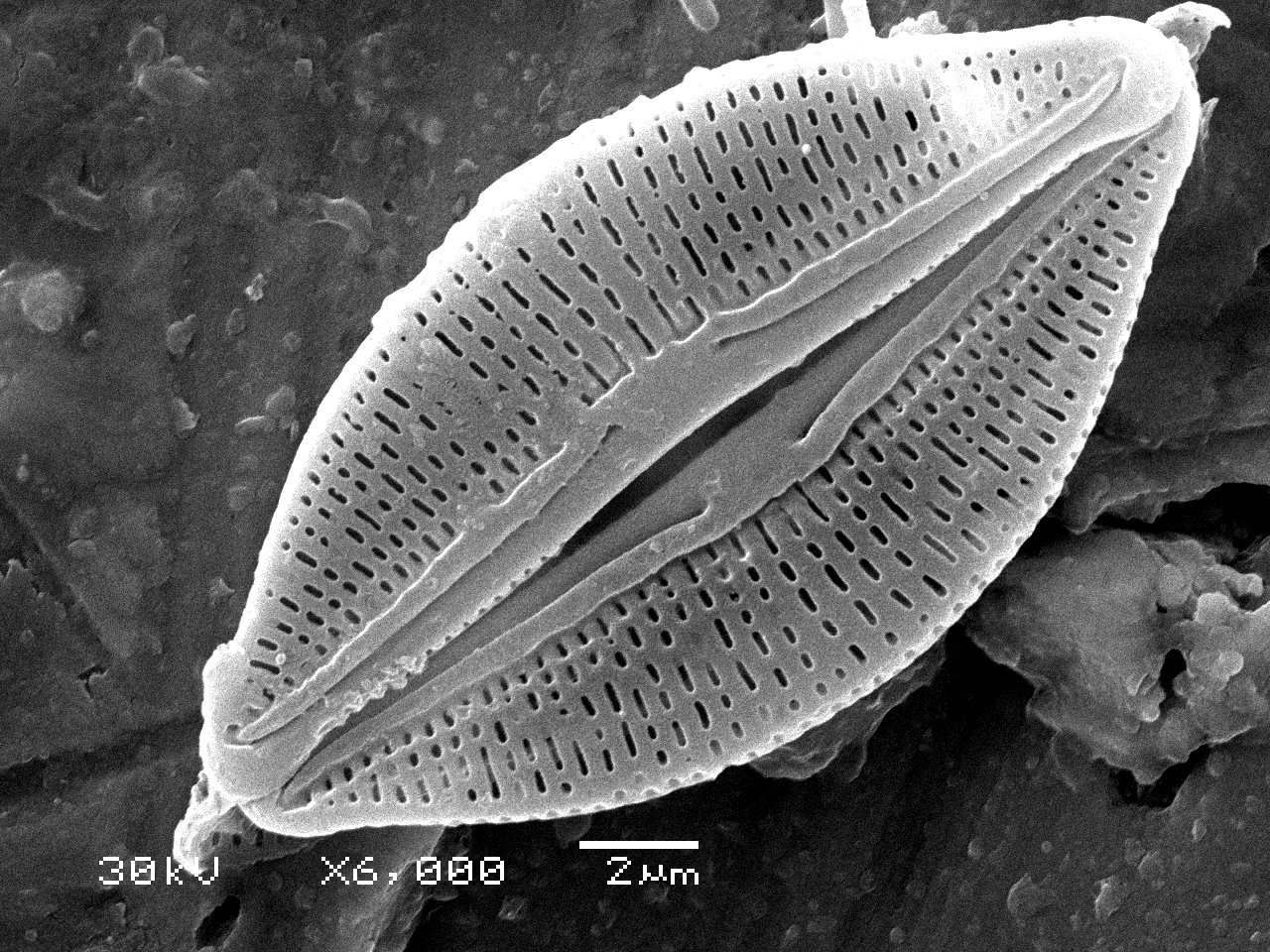
Diatoms have glass like cell walls made of silica and called frustules.

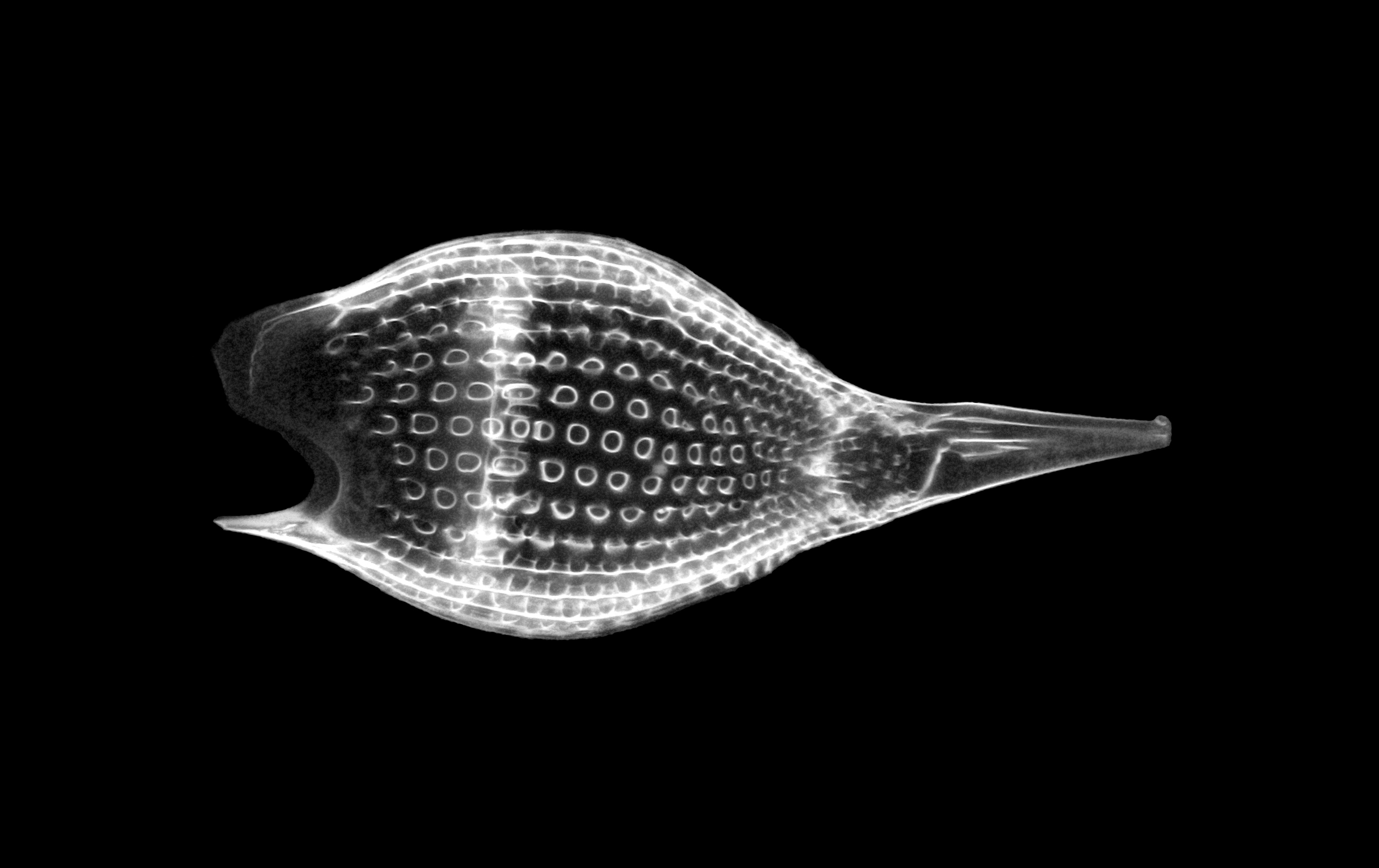
Radiolarian

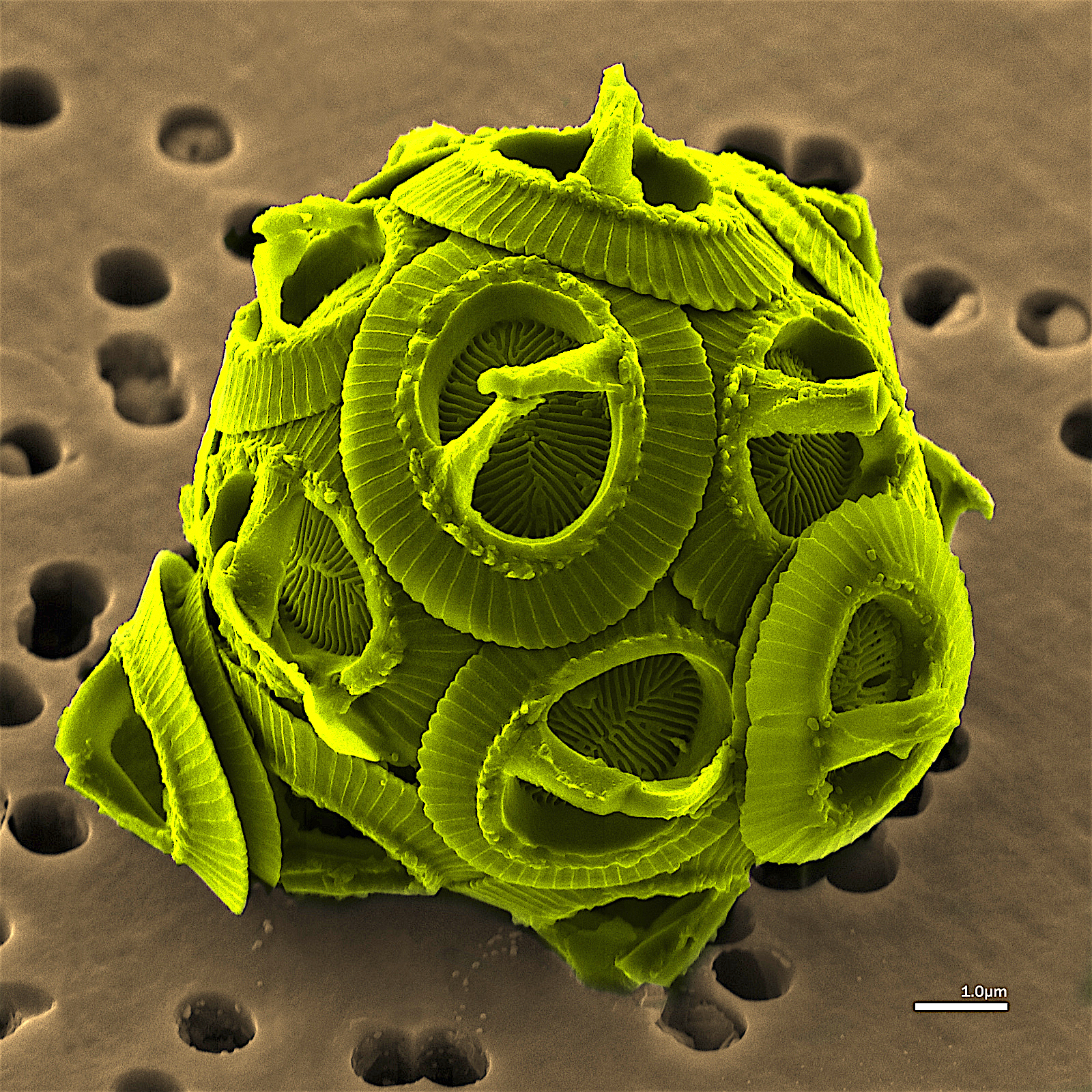
Single-celled alga, Gephyrocapsa oceanica

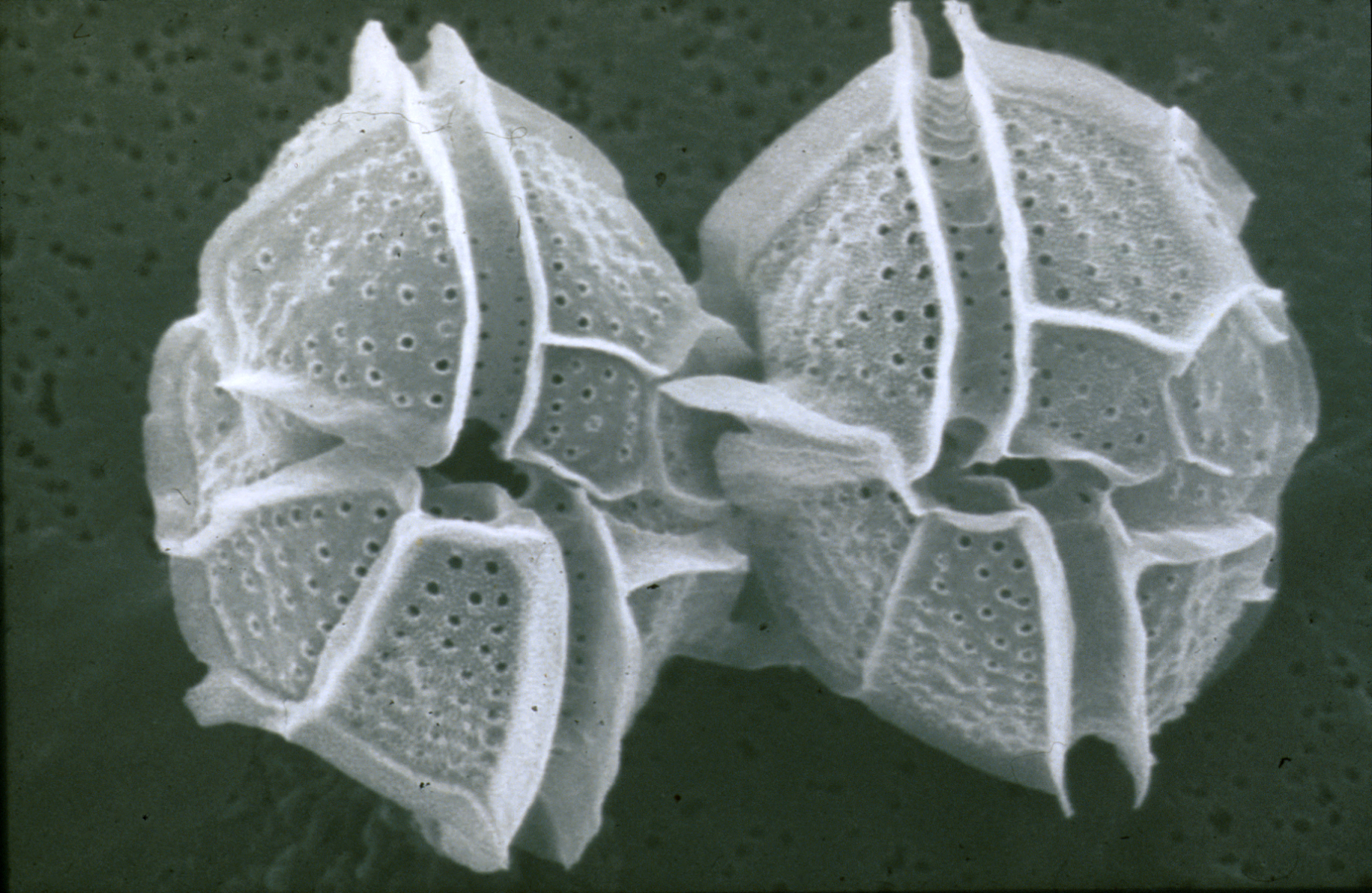
Two dinoflagellates

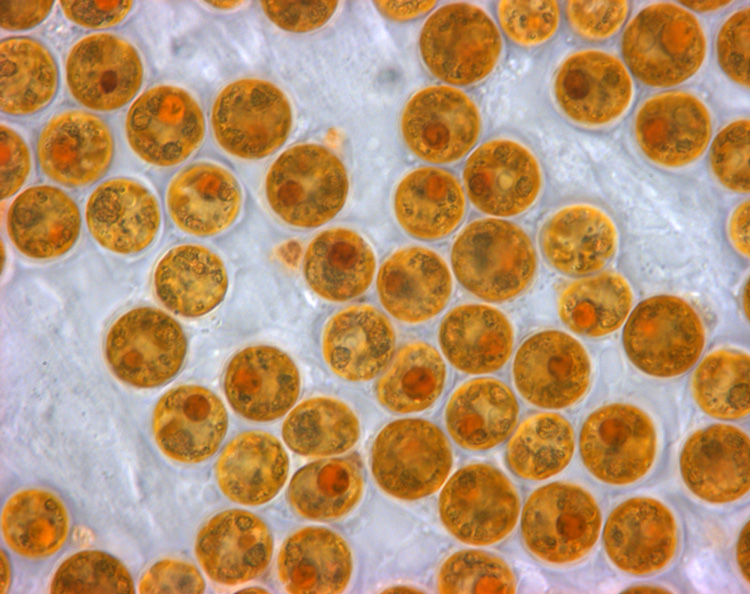
Zooxanthellae is a photosynthetic algae that lives inside hosts like coral.

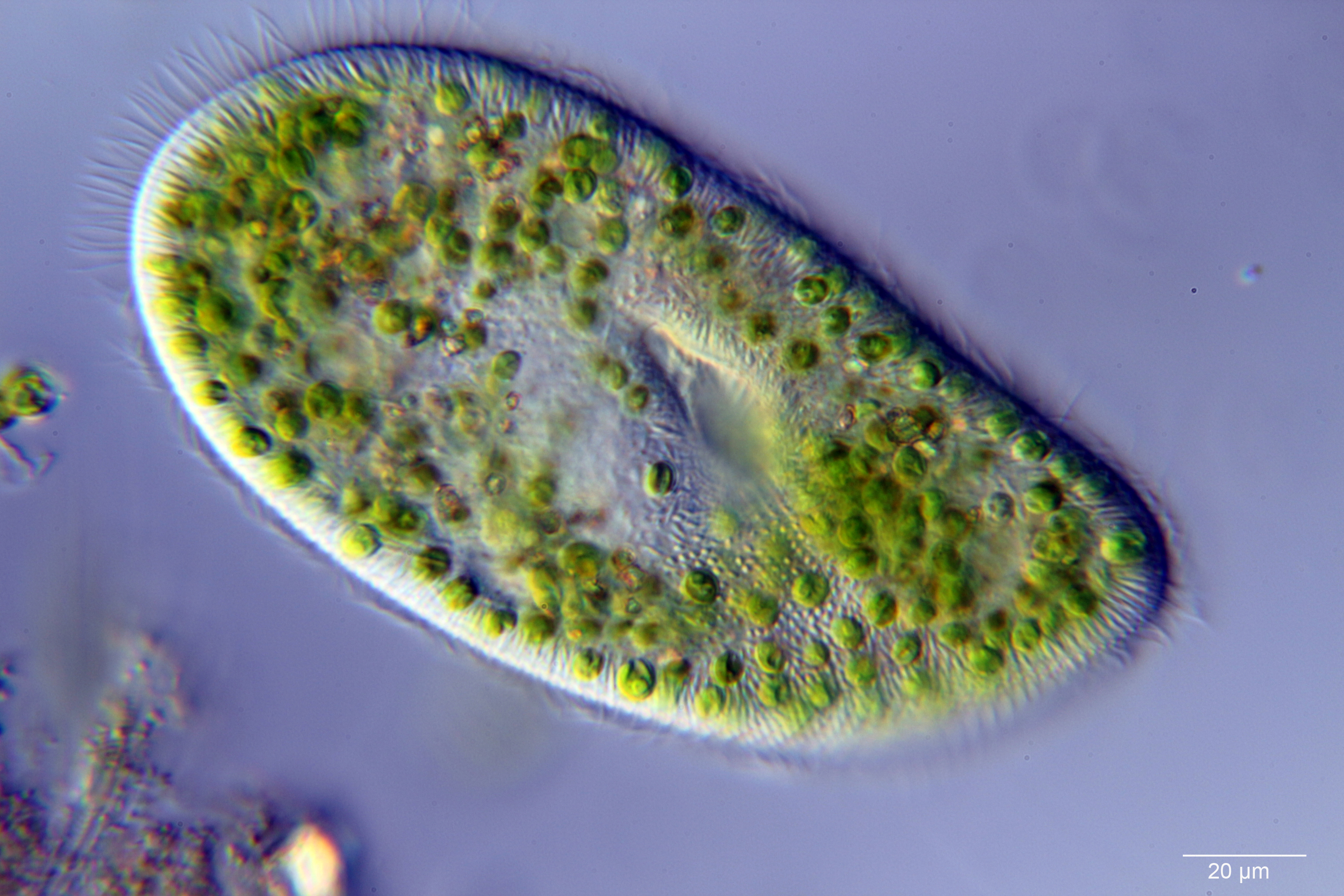
A single-celled ciliate with green zoochlorellae living inside endosymbiotically.

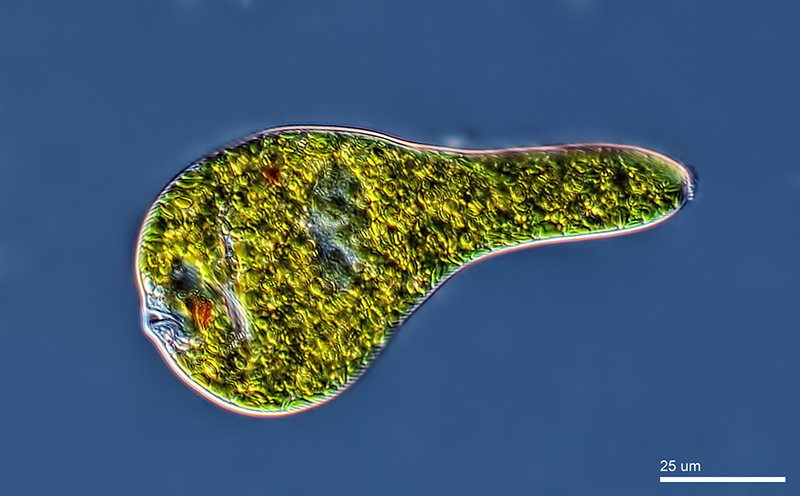
Euglenoid

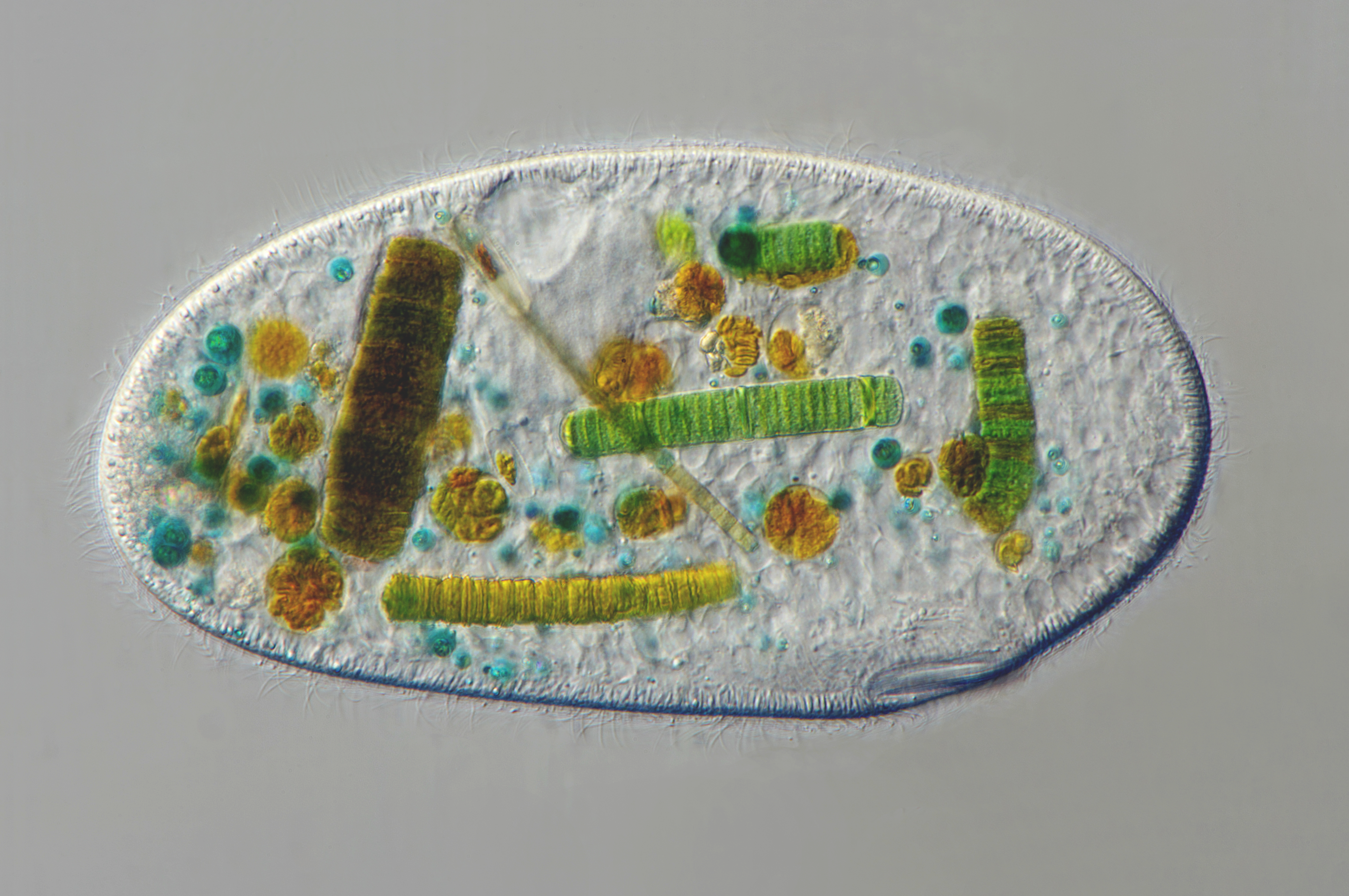
This ciliate is digesting cyanobacteria. The cytostome or mouth is at the bottom right.

In contrast to the cells of prokaryotes, the cells of eukaryotes are highly organized. Plants, animals and fungi are usually multi-celled and are typically macroscopic. Most protists are single-celled and microscopic. But there are exceptions. Some single-celled marine protists are macroscopic. Some marine slime molds have unique life cycles that involve switching between unicellular, colonial, and multicellular forms. Other marine protist are neither single-celled nor microscopic, such as seaweed.

Macroscopic protists (see also unicellular macroalgae →)

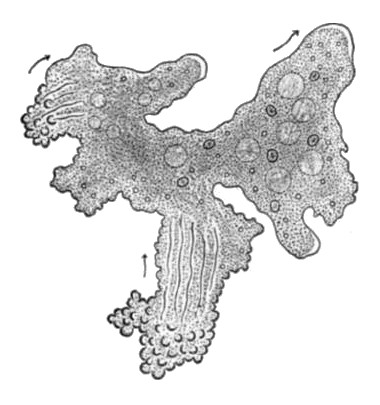
The single-celled giant amoeba has up to 1000 nuclei and reaches lengths of 5 mm (0.20 in).

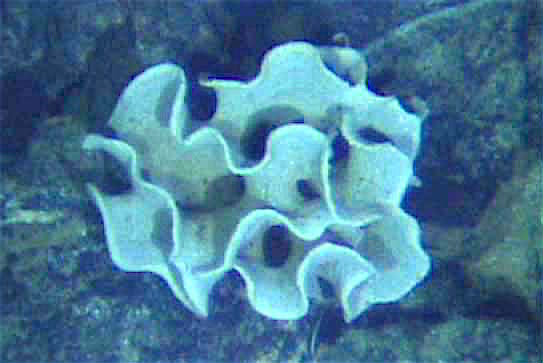
The xenophyophore, another single-celled foraminiferan, lives in abyssal zones. It has a giant shell up to 20 cm (7.9 in) across.

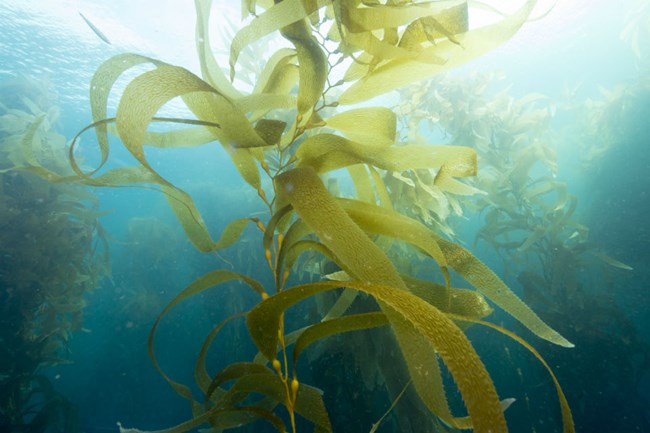
Giant kelp, a brown algae, is not a true plant, yet it is multicellular and can grow to 50m.

Protists have been described as a taxonomic grab bag where anything that doesn't fit into one of the main biological kingdoms can be placed. Some modern authors prefer to exclude multicellular organisms from the traditional definition of a protist, restricting protists to unicellular organisms. This more constrained definition excludes seaweeds and slime molds.

=== Marine microanimals ===
External videos
- Copepods: The Diatom-Devouring King of Plankton - Journey to the Microcosmos

As juveniles, animals develop from microscopic stages, which can include spores, eggs and larvae. At least one microscopic animal group, the parasitic cnidarian Myxozoa, is unicellular in its adult form, and includes marine species. Other adult marine microanimals are multicellular. Microscopic adult arthropods are more commonly found inland in freshwater, but there are marine species as well. Microscopic adult marine crustaceans include some copepods, cladocera and tardigrades (water bears). Some marine nematodes and rotifers are also too small to be recognized with the naked eye, as are many loricifera, including the recently discovered anaerobic species that spend their lives in an anoxic environment. Copepods contribute more to the secondary productivity and carbon sink of the world oceans than any other group of organisms. While mites are not normally thought of as marine organisms, most species of the family Halacaridae live in the sea.

Marine microanimals

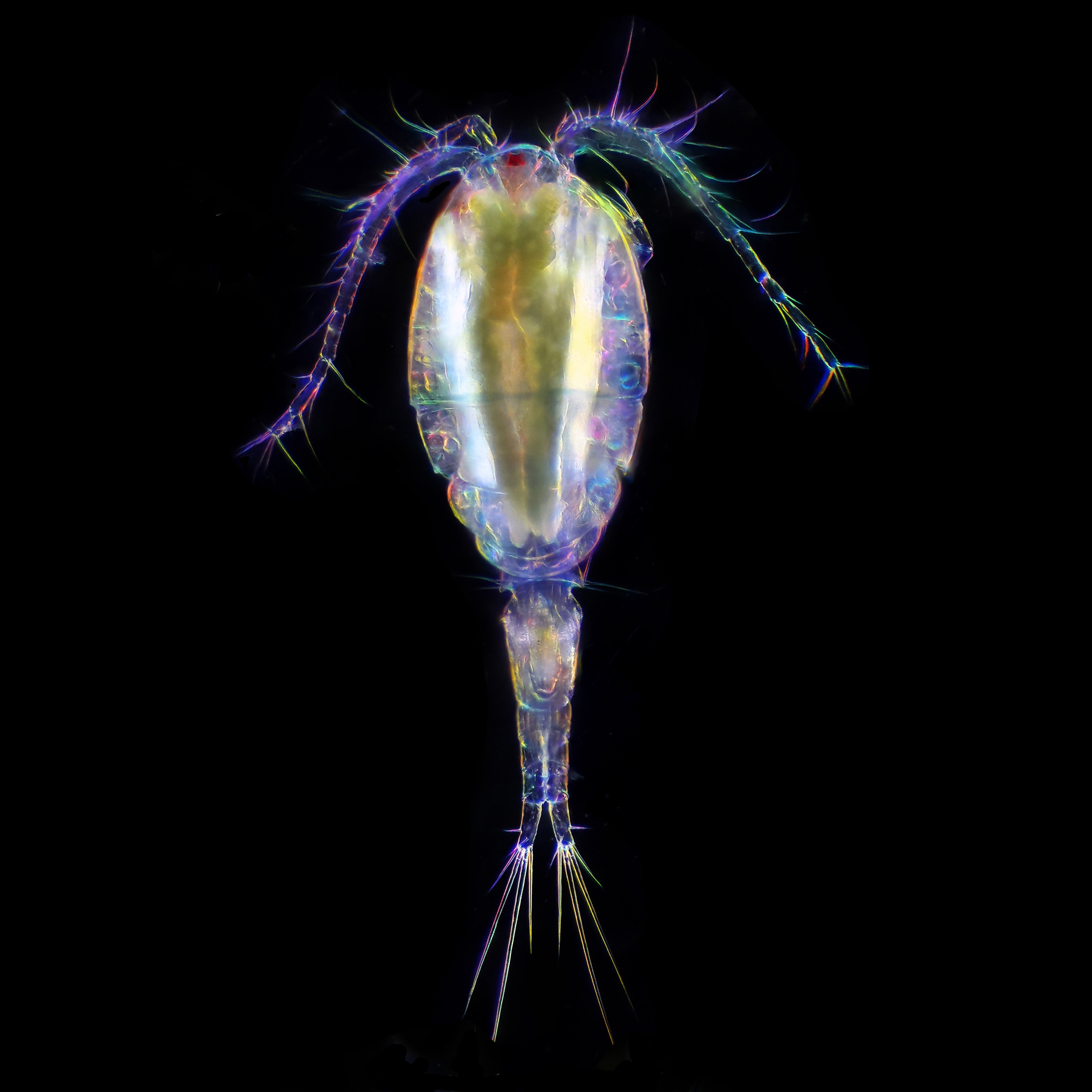
Over 10,000 marine species are copepods, small, often microscopic crustaceans

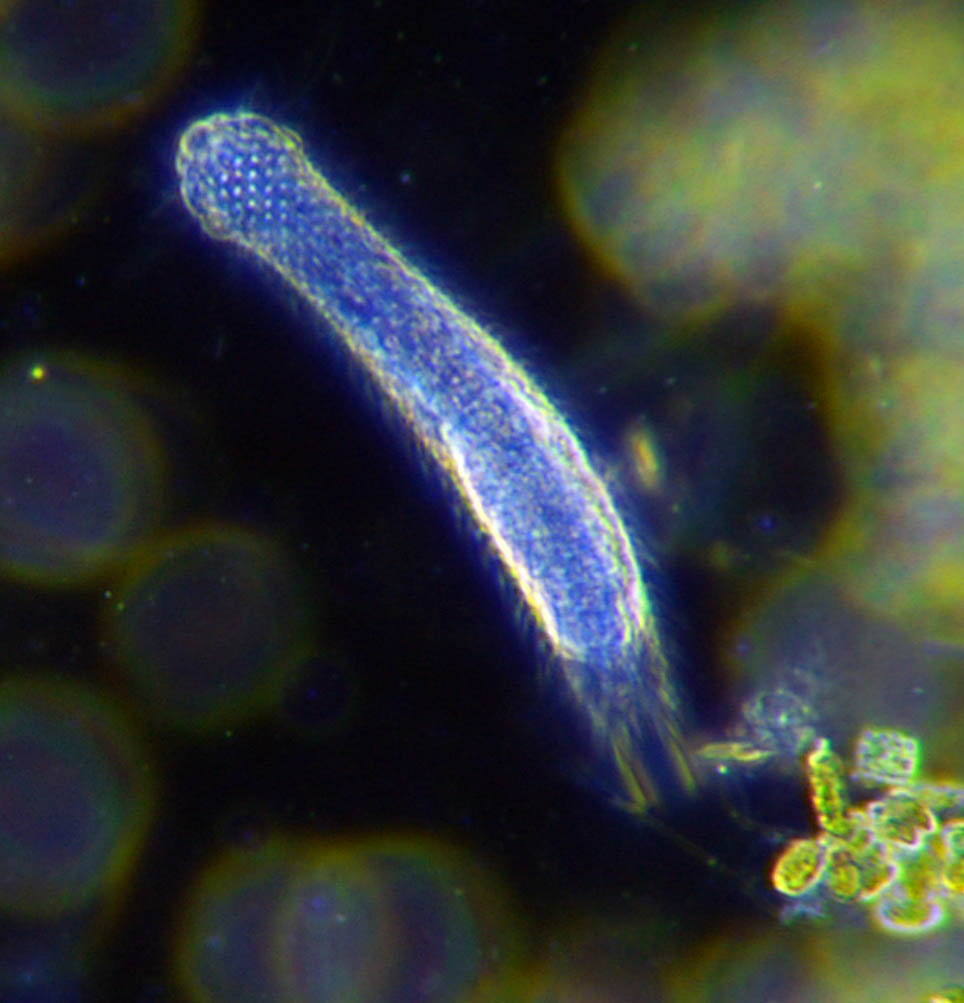
Darkfield photo of a gastrotrich, a worm-like animal living between sediment particles

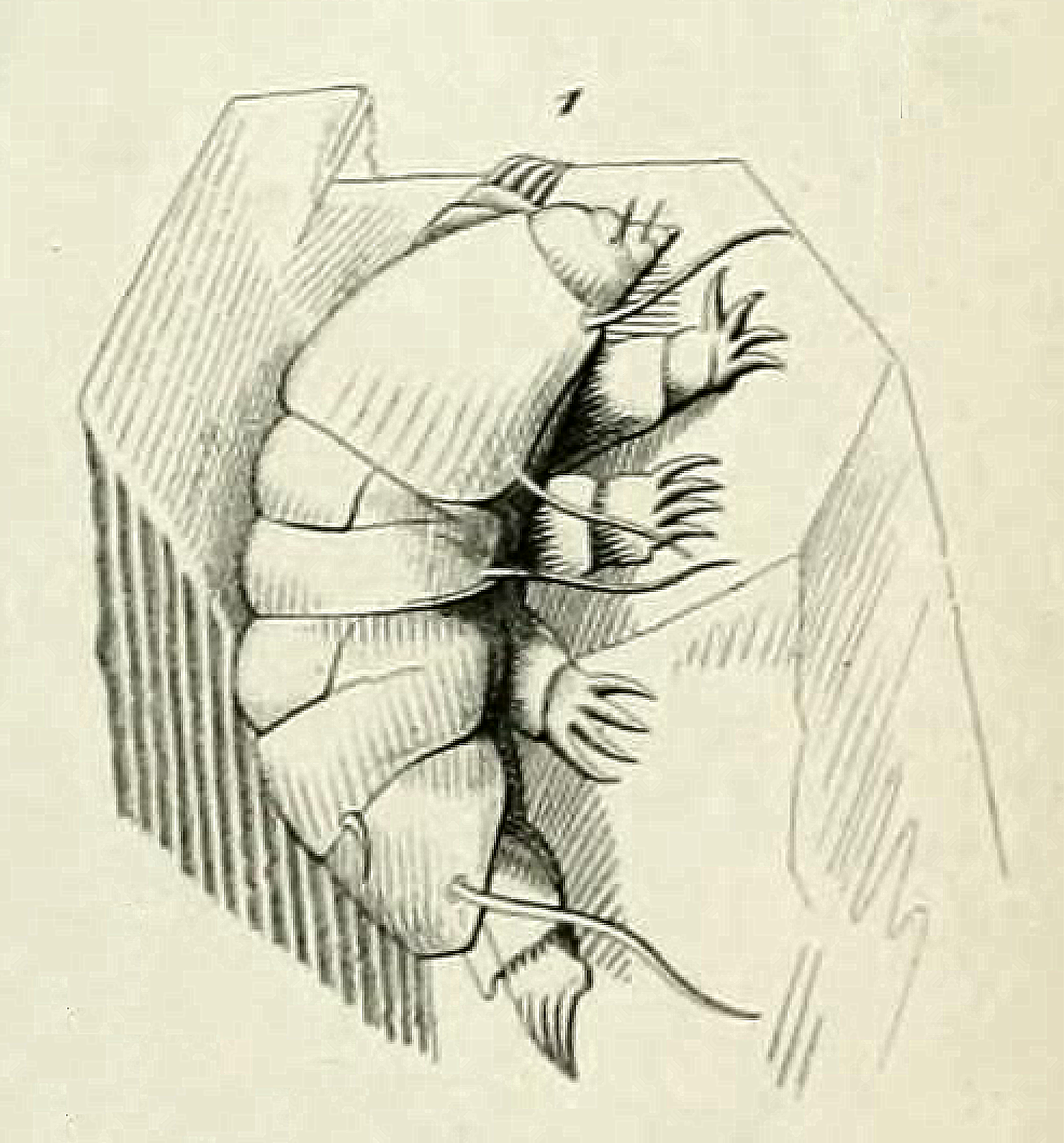
Drawing of a tardigrade (water bear) on a grain of sand

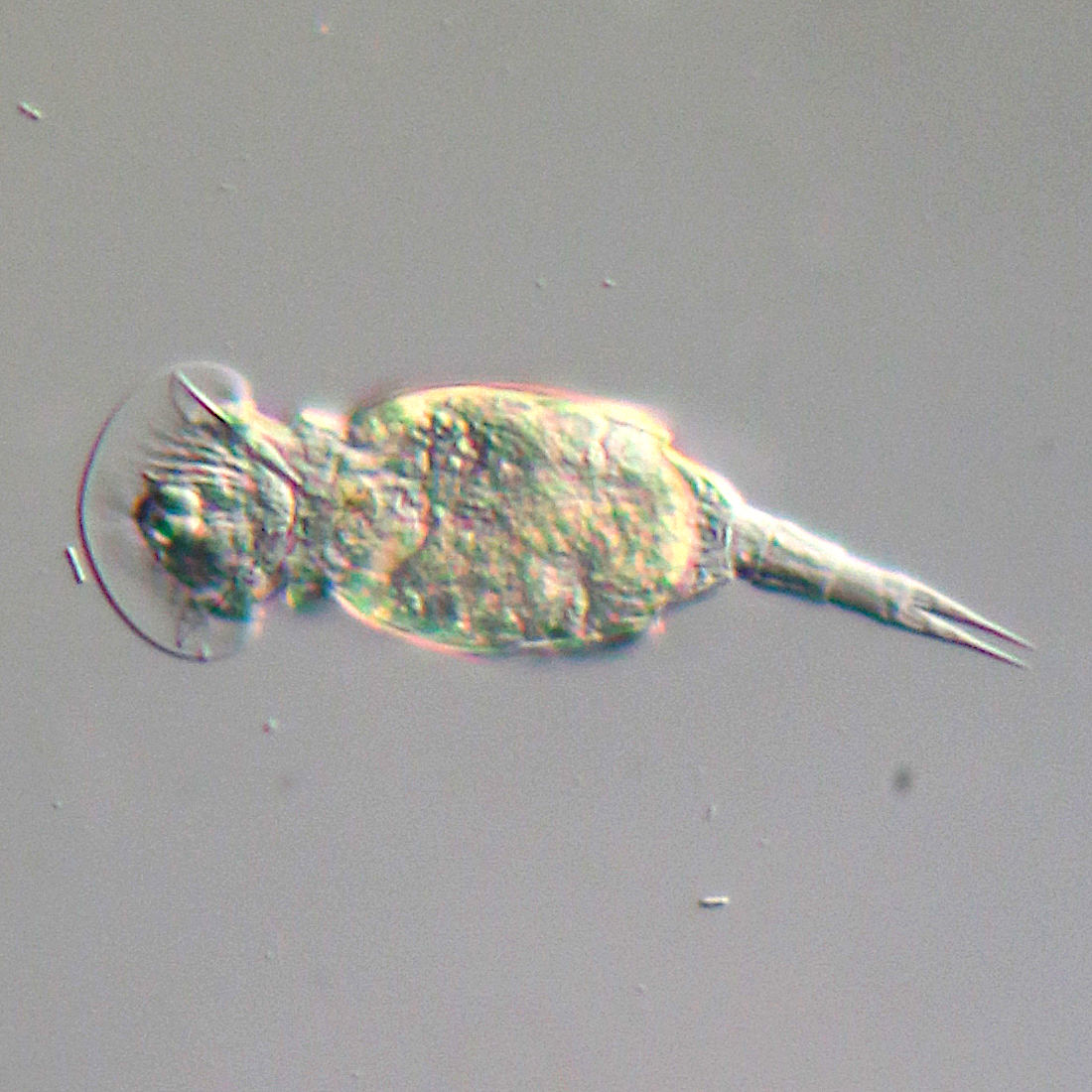
Rotifers, usually 0.1–0.5 mm long, may look like protists but have many cells and belongs to the Animalia.

== Fungi ==
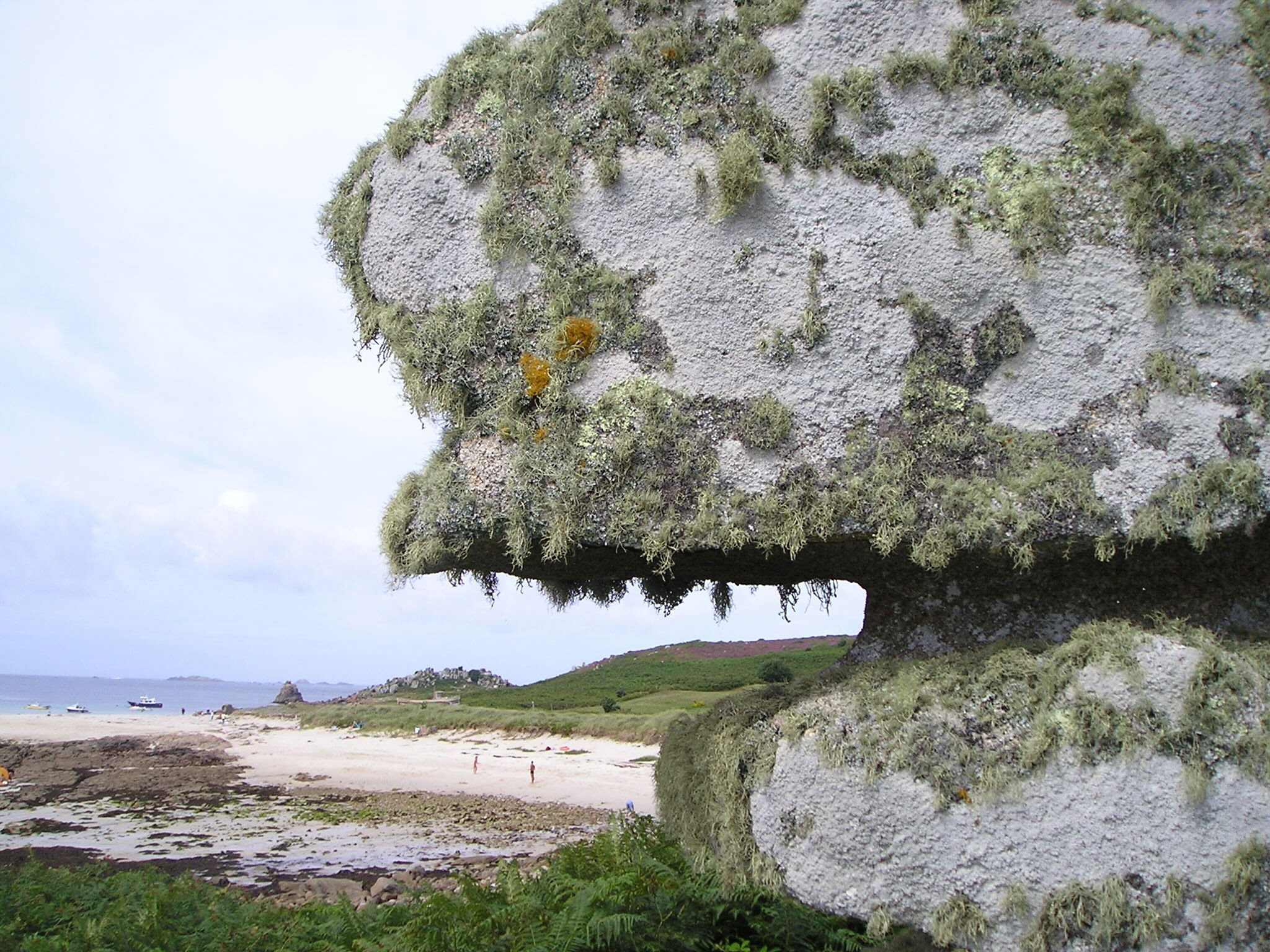
Lichen on a rock in a marine splash zone. Lichens are mutualistic associations between a fungus and an alga or cyanobacterium.

Over 1,500 species of fungi are known from marine environments. These are parasitic on marine algae or animals, or are saprobes feeding on dead organic matter from algae, corals, protozoan cysts, sea grasses, wood and other substrata. Spores of many species have special appendages which facilitate attachment to the substratum. Marine fungi can also be found in sea foam and around hydrothermal areas of the ocean. A diverse range of unusual secondary metabolites is produced by marine fungi.

Mycoplankton are saprotropic members of the plankton communities of marine and freshwater ecosystems. They are composed of filamentous free-living fungi and yeasts associated with planktonic particles or phytoplankton. Similar to bacterioplankton, these aquatic fungi play a significant role in heterotrophic mineralization and nutrient cycling. Mycoplankton can be up to 20 mm in diameter and over 50 mm in length.

A typical milliliter of seawater contains about 10^{3} to 10^{4} fungal cells. This number is greater in coastal ecosystems and estuaries due to nutritional runoff from terrestrial communities. A higher diversity of mycoplankton is found around coasts and in surface waters down to 1000 meters, with a vertical profile that depends on how abundant phytoplankton is. This profile changes between seasons due to changes in nutrient availability. Marine fungi survive in a constant oxygen deficient environment, and therefore depend on oxygen diffusion by turbulence and oxygen generated by photosynthetic organisms.

Marine fungi can be classified as:

- Lower fungi - adapted to marine habitats (zoosporic fungi, including mastigomycetes: oomycetes and chytridiomycetes)
- Higher fungi - filamentous, modified to planktonic lifestyle (hyphomycetes, ascomycetes, basidiomycetes). Most mycoplankton species are higher fungi.

Lichens are mutualistic associations between a fungus, usually an ascomycete, and an alga or a cyanobacterium. Several lichens are found in marine environments. Many more occur in the splash zone, where they occupy different vertical zones depending on how tolerant they are to submersion. Some lichens live a long time; one species has been dated at 8,600 years. However their lifespan is difficult to measure because what defines the same lichen is not precise. Lichens grow by vegetatively breaking off a piece, which may or may not be defined as the same lichen, and two lichens of different ages can merge, raising the issue of whether it is the same lichen. The sea snail Littoraria irrorata damages plants of Spartina in the sea marshes where it lives, which enables spores of intertidal ascomycetous fungi to colonize the plant. The snail then eats the fungal growth in preference to the grass itself.

According to fossil records, fungi date back to the late Proterozoic era 900–570 million years ago. Fossil marine lichens 600 million years old have been discovered in China. It has been hypothesized that mycoplankton evolved from terrestrial fungi, likely in the Paleozoic era (390 million years ago).

== Origin of animals ==
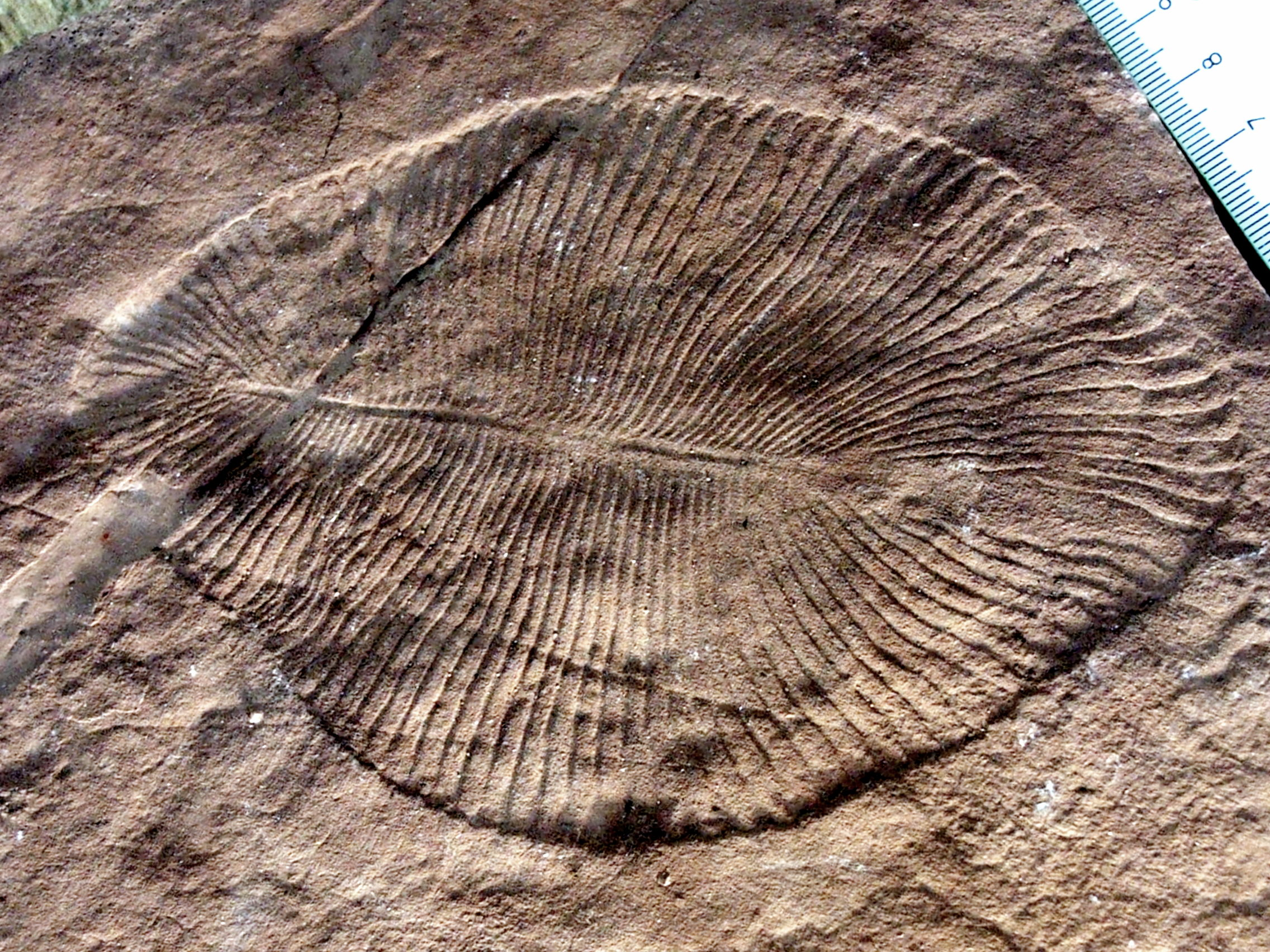
Dickinsonia may be the earliest animal. They appear in the fossil record 571 million to 541 million years ago.

The earliest animals were marine invertebrates, that is, vertebrates came later. Animals are multicellular eukaryotes, (Note: Myxozoa were thought to be an exception, but are now thought to be heavily modified members of the Cnidaria. Jiménez-Guri E, Philippe H, Okamura B, Holland PW (July 2007). "Buddenbrockia is a cnidarian worm". Science. 317 (5834): 116–8. Bibcode:2007Sci...317..116J. doi:10.1126/science.1142024. PMID 17615357. S2CID 5170702.) and are distinguished from plants, algae, and fungi by lacking cell walls. Marine invertebrates are animals that inhabit a marine environment apart from the vertebrate members of the chordate phylum; invertebrates lack a vertebral column. Some have evolved a shell or a hard exoskeleton.

The earliest animal fossils may belong to the genus Dickinsonia, 571 million to 541 million years ago. Individual Dickinsonia typically resemble a bilaterally symmetrical ribbed oval. They kept growing until they were covered with sediment or otherwise killed, and spent most of their lives with their bodies firmly anchored to the sediment. Their taxonomic affinities are presently unknown, but their mode of growth is consistent with a bilaterian affinity.

Apart from Dickinsonia, the earliest widely accepted animal fossils are the rather modern-looking cnidarians (the group that includes coral, jellyfish, sea anemones and Hydra), possibly from around 580 Ma The Ediacara biota, which flourished for the last 40 million years before the start of the Cambrian, were the first animals more than a very few centimeters long. Like Dickinsonia, many were flat with a "quilted" appearance, and seemed so strange that there was a proposal to classify them as a separate kingdom, Vendobionta. Others, however, have been interpreted as early molluscs (Kimberella), echinoderms (Arkarua), and arthropods (Spriggina, Parvancorina). There is still debate about the classification of these specimens, mainly because the diagnostic features which allow taxonomists to classify more recent organisms, such as similarities to living organisms, are generally absent in the Ediacarans. However, there seems little doubt that Kimberella was at least a triploblastic bilaterian animal, in other words, an animal significantly more complex than the cnidarians.

Small shelly fauna are a very mixed collection of fossils found between the Late Ediacaran and Middle Cambrian periods. The earliest, Cloudina, shows signs of successful defense against predation and may indicate the start of an evolutionary arms race. Some tiny Early Cambrian shells almost certainly belonged to molluscs, while the owners of some "armor plates," Halkieria and Microdictyon, were eventually identified when more complete specimens were found in Cambrian lagerstätten that preserved soft-bodied animals.

=== Body plans and phyla ===
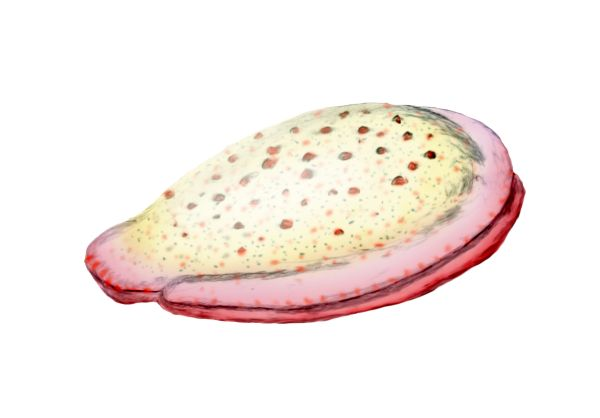
Kimberella, an early mollusc important for understanding the Cambrian explosion. Invertebrates are grouped into different phyla (body plans).

Invertebrates are grouped into different phyla. Informally phyla can be thought of as a way of grouping organisms according to their body plan. A body plan refers to a blueprint which describes the shape or morphology of an organism, such as its symmetry, segmentation and the disposition of its appendages. The idea of body plans originated with vertebrates, which were grouped into one phylum. But the vertebrate body plan is only one of many, and invertebrates consist of many phyla or body plans. The history of the discovery of body plans can be seen as a movement from a worldview centered on vertebrates, to seeing the vertebrates as one body plan among many. Among the pioneering zoologists, Linnaeus identified two body plans outside the vertebrates; Cuvier identified three; and Haeckel had four, as well as the Protista with eight more, for a total of twelve. For comparison, the number of phyla recognized by modern zoologists has risen to 35.

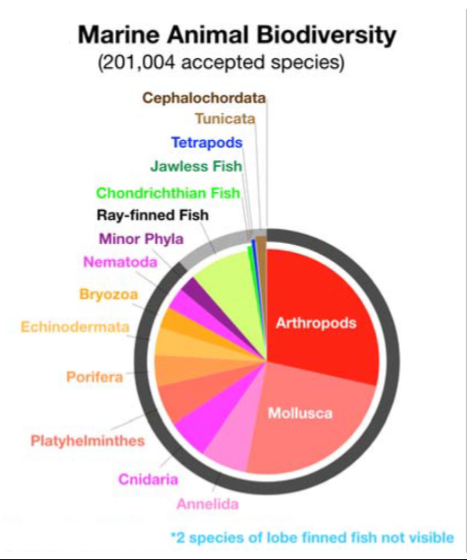
Taxonomic biodiversity of accepted marine species, according to WoRMS, 18 October 2019.

Historically body plans were thought of as having evolved rapidly during the Cambrian explosion, but a more nuanced understanding of animal evolution suggests a gradual development of body plans throughout the early Palaeozoic and beyond. More generally a phylum can be defined in two ways: as described above, as a group of organisms with a certain degree of morphological or developmental similarity (the phenetic definition), or a group of organisms with a certain degree of evolutionary relatedness (the phylogenetic definition).

In the 1970s there was already a debate about whether the emergence of the modern phyla was "explosive" or gradual but hidden by the shortage of Precambrian animal fossils. A re-analysis of fossils from the Burgess Shale lagerstätte increased interest in the issue when it revealed animals, such as Opabinia, which did not fit into any known phylum. At the time these were interpreted as evidence that the modern phyla had evolved very rapidly in the Cambrian explosion and that the Burgess Shale's "weird wonders" showed that the Early Cambrian was a uniquely experimental period of animal evolution. Later discoveries of similar animals and the development of new theoretical approaches led to the conclusion that many of the "weird wonders" were evolutionary "aunts" or "cousins" of modern groups—for example that Opabinia was a member of the lobopods, a group which includes the ancestors of the arthropods, and that it may have been closely related to the modern tardigrades. Nevertheless, there is still much debate about whether the Cambrian explosion was really explosive and, if so, how and why it happened and why it appears unique in the history of animals.

=== Earliest animals ===
The deepest-branching animals – the earliest animals that appeared during evolution – are marine non-vertebrate organisms. The earliest animal phyla are the Porifera, Ctenophora, Placozoa and Cnidaria. No member of these clades exhibit body plans with bilateral symmetry.

- - 950 mya
    Choanoflagellata unicellular protists thought to be the closest living relatives of animals
  - Animals 760 mya
    - Porifera sponges – asymmetric
    - - Ctenophora comb jellies – biradial symmetry
      - - Placozoa simplest animals – asymmetric
        - - Cnidaria have tentacles with stingers – radial symmetry
          - - bilaterians all remaining animals – bilateral symmetry →

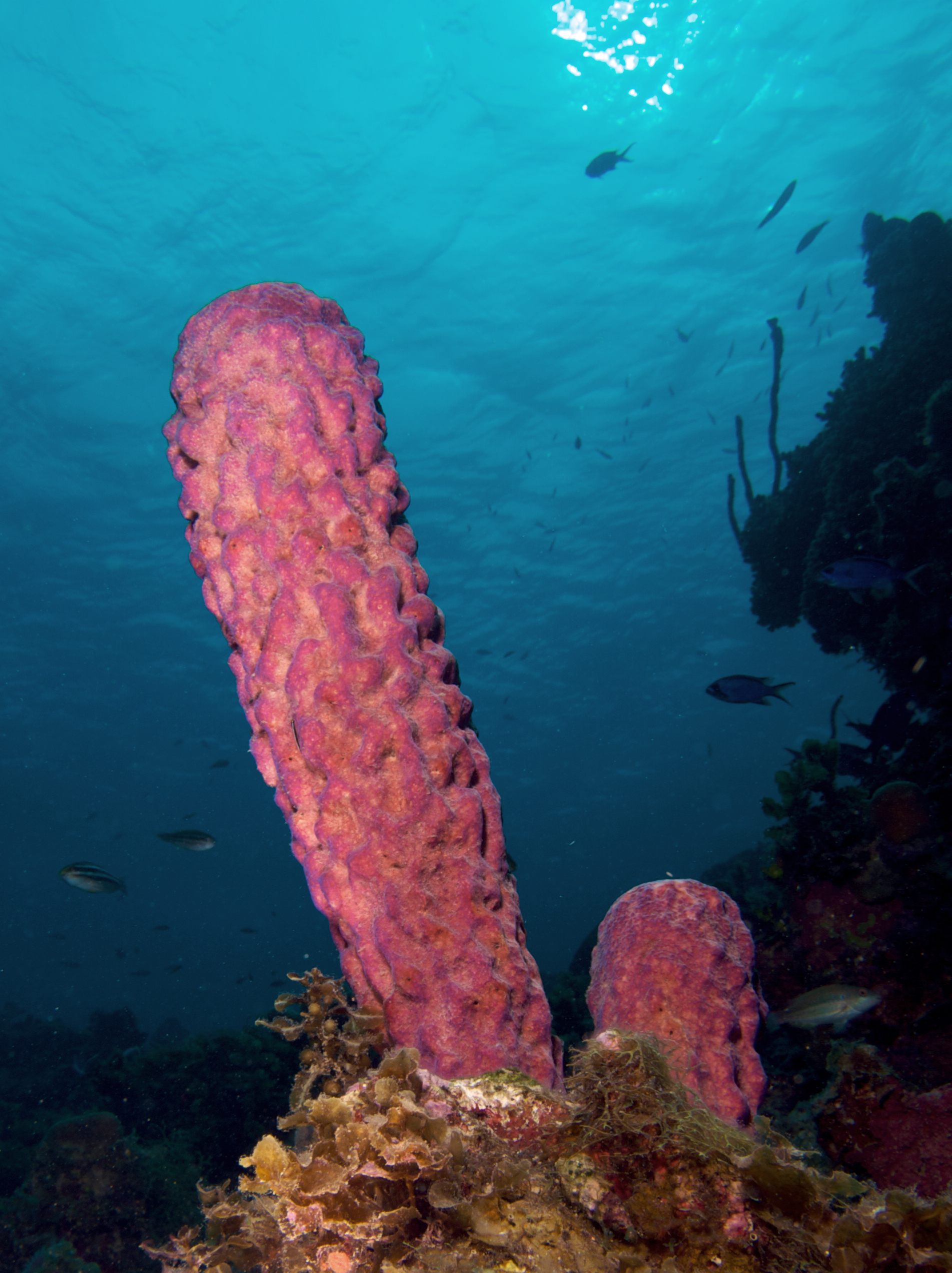
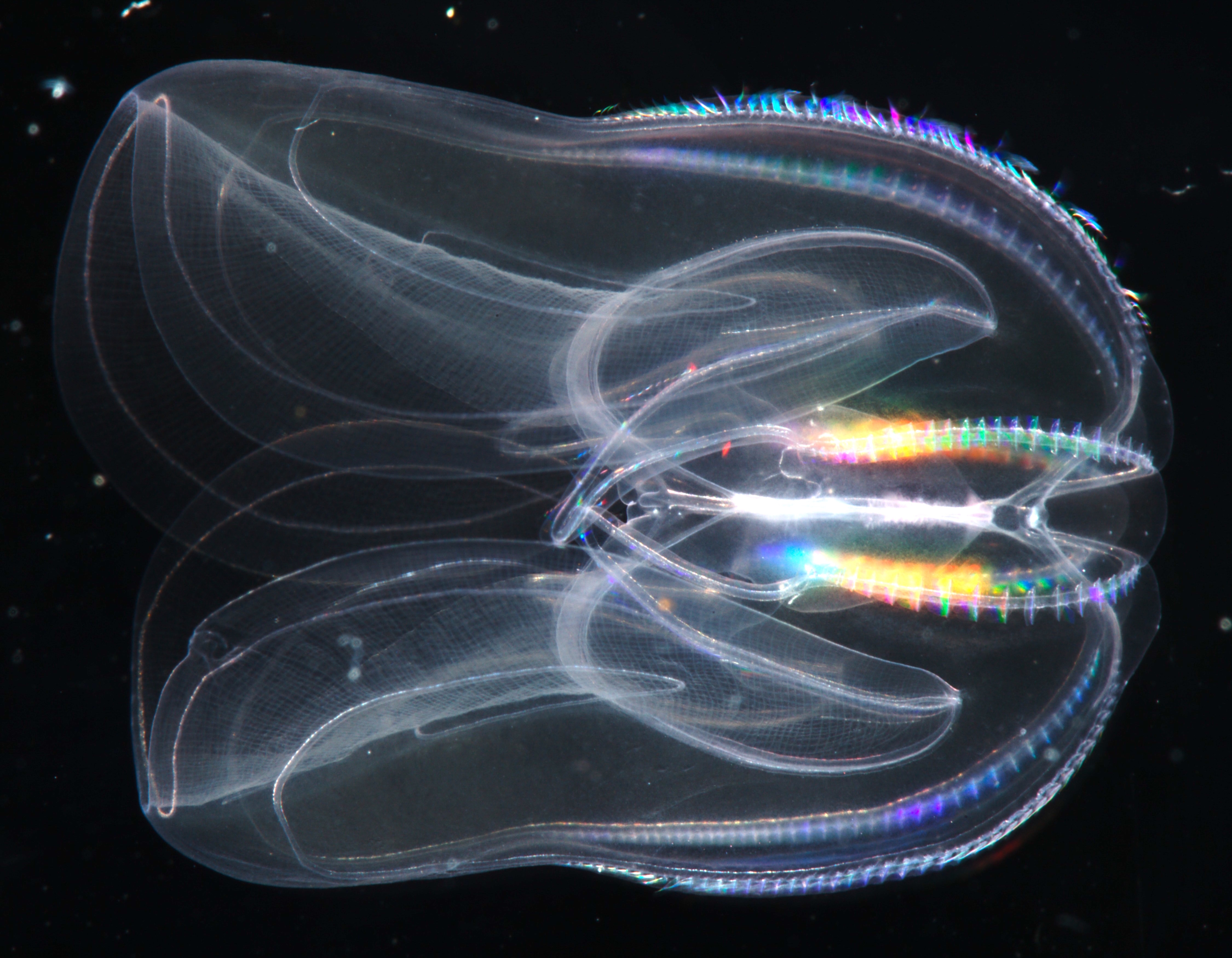
There has been much controversy over which invertebrate phyla, sponges or comb jellies, is the most basal. Currently, sponges are more widely considered to be the most basal.

==== Marine sponges ====
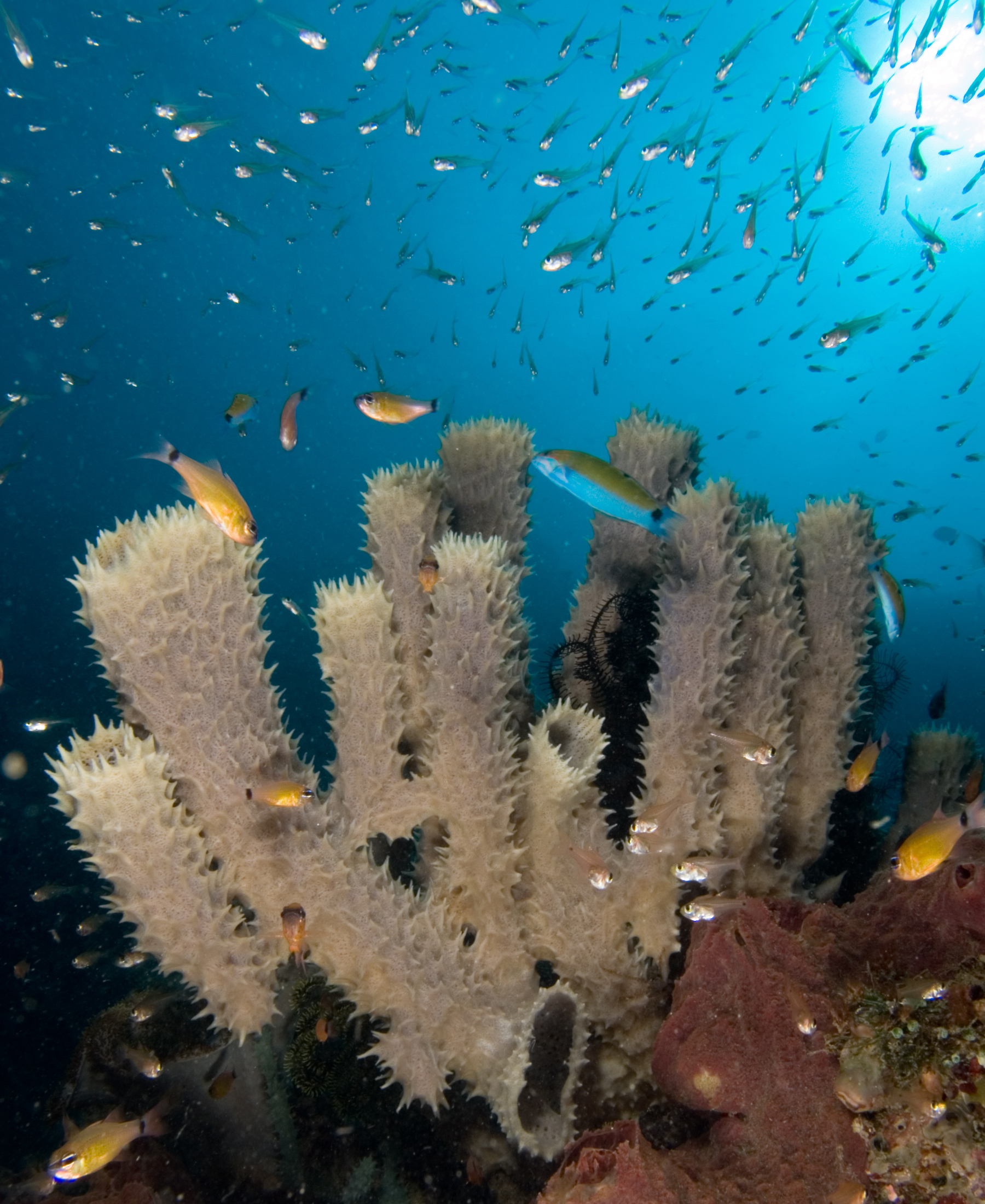
Sponges are perhaps the most basal animals. They have no nervous, digestive or circulatory system.

Sponges are animals of the phylum Porifera (from Modern Latin for bearing pores). They are multicellular organisms that have bodies full of pores and channels allowing water to circulate through them, consisting of jelly-like mesohyl sandwiched between two thin layers of cells. They have non-specialized cells that can transform into other types and that often migrate between the main cell layers and the mesohyl in the process. Sponges do not have nervous, digestive or circulatory systems. Instead, most rely on maintaining a constant water flow through their bodies to obtain food and oxygen and to remove wastes.

Sponges are similar to other animals in that they are multicellular, heterotrophic, lack cell walls and produce sperm cells. Unlike other animals, they lack true tissues and organs, and have no body symmetry. The shapes of their bodies are adapted for maximal efficiency of water flow through the central cavity, where it deposits nutrients, and leaves through a hole called the osculum. Many sponges have internal skeletons of spongin and/or spicules of calcium carbonate or silicon dioxide. All sponges are sessile aquatic animals. Although there are freshwater species, the great majority are marine (salt water) species, ranging from tidal zones to depths exceeding 8,800 m (5.5 mi). Some sponges live to great ages; there is evidence of the deep-sea glass sponge Monorhaphis chuni living about 11,000 years.

While most of the approximately 5,000–10,000 known species feed on bacteria and other food particles in the water, some host photosynthesizing micro-organisms as endosymbionts and these alliances often produce more food and oxygen than they consume. A few species of sponge that live in food-poor environments have become carnivores that prey mainly on small crustaceans.

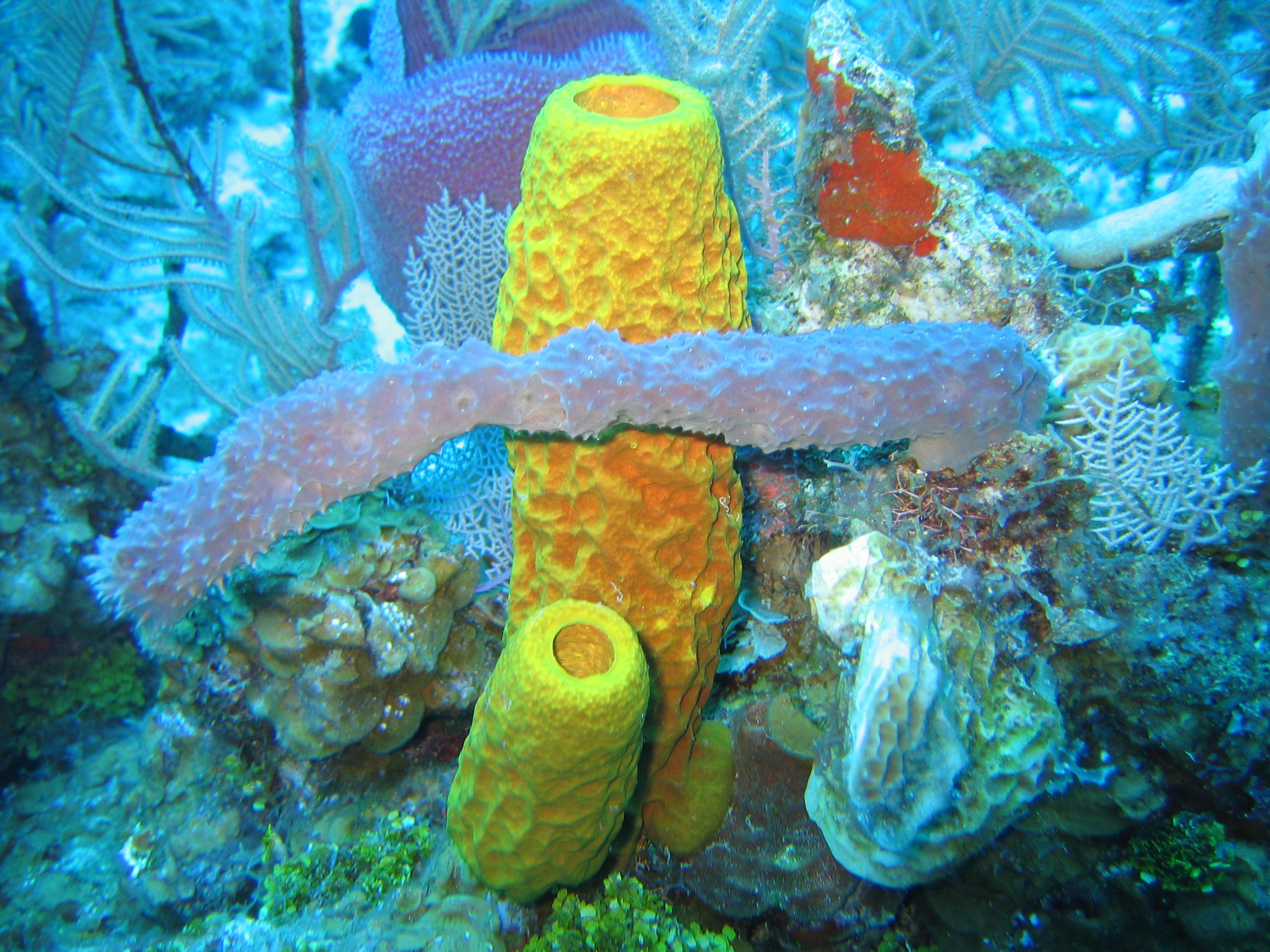
Sponge biodiversity. There are four sponge species in this photo.

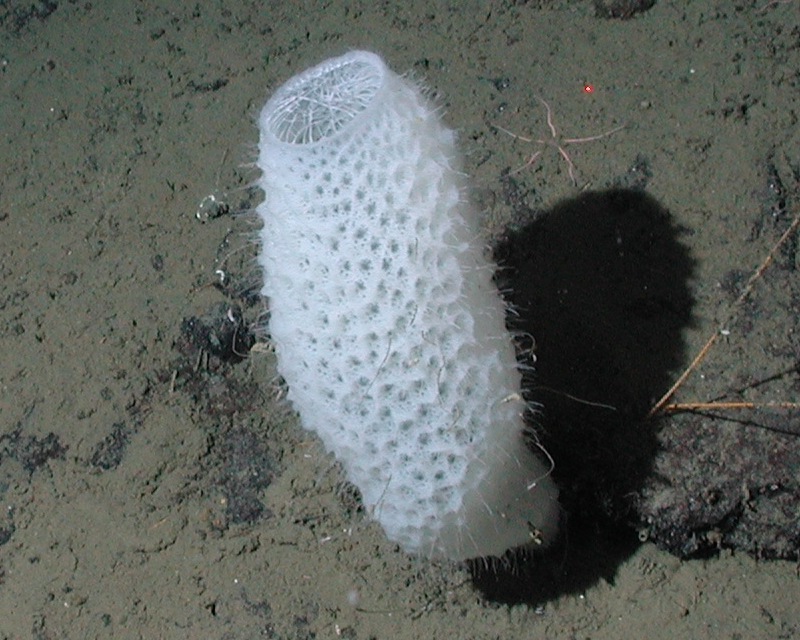
Venus' flower basket at a depth of 2572 meters

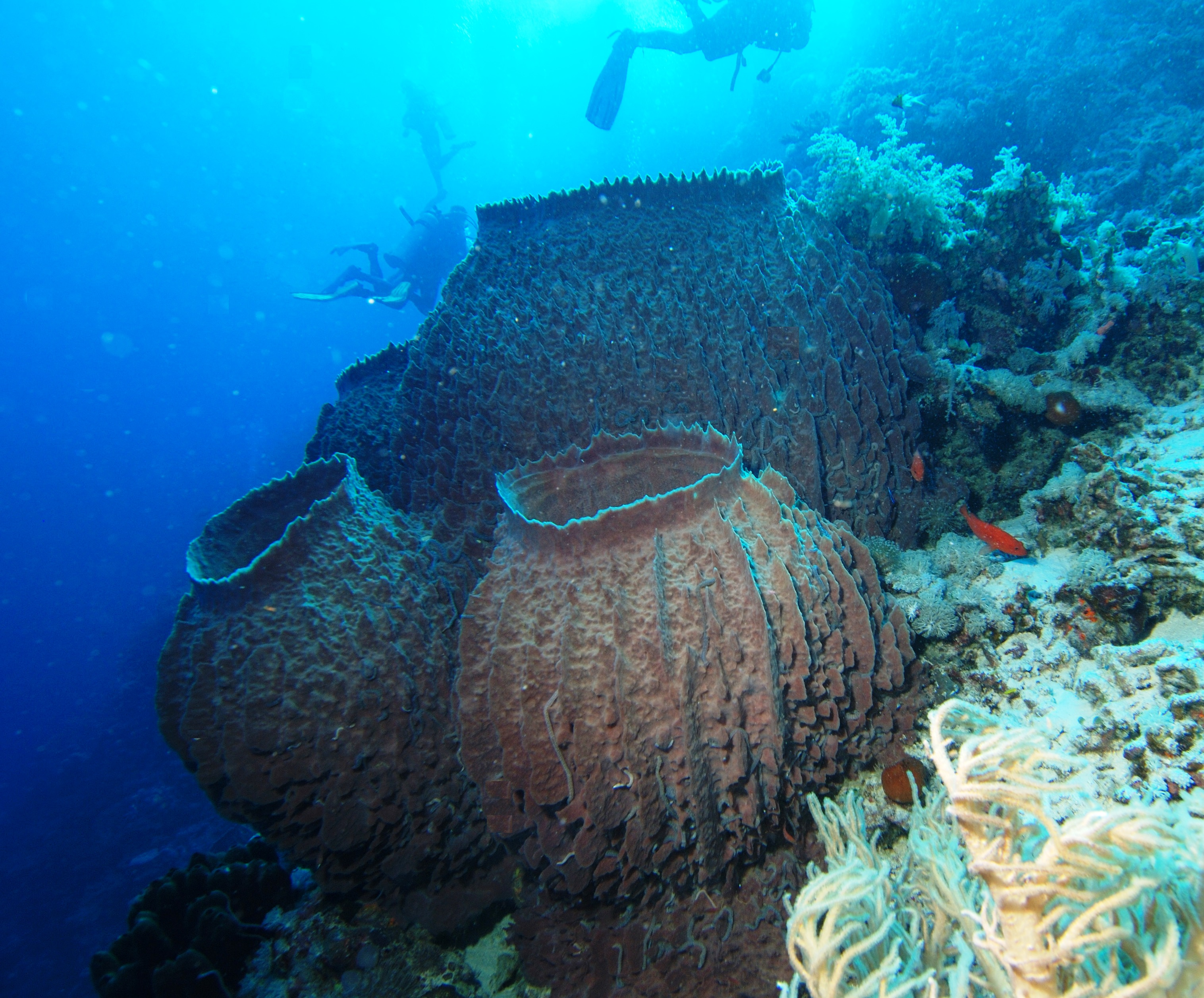
Barrel sponge

Linnaeus mistakenly identified sponges as plants in the order Algae. For a long time thereafter sponges were assigned to a separate subkingdom, Parazoa (meaning beside the animals). They are now classified as a paraphyletic phylum from which the higher animals have evolved.

==== Ctenophores ====
Ctenophores (from Greek for carrying a comb), commonly known as comb jellies, are a phylum that live worldwide in marine waters. They are the largest non-colonial animals to swim with the help of cilia (hairs or combs). Coastal species need to be tough enough to withstand waves and swirling sediment, but some oceanic species are so fragile and transparent that it is very difficult to capture them intact for study. In the past ctenophores were thought to have only a modest presence in the ocean, but it is now known they are often significant and even dominant parts of the planktonic biomass.

The phylum has about 150 known species with a wide range of body forms. Sizes range from a few millimeters to 1.5 m (4 ft 11 in). Cydippids are egg-shaped with their cilia arranged in eight radial comb rows, and deploy retractable tentacles for capturing prey. The benthic platyctenids are generally combless and flat. The coastal beroids have gaping mouths and lack tentacles. Most adult ctenophores prey on microscopic larvae and rotifers and small crustaceans but beroids prey on other ctenophores.

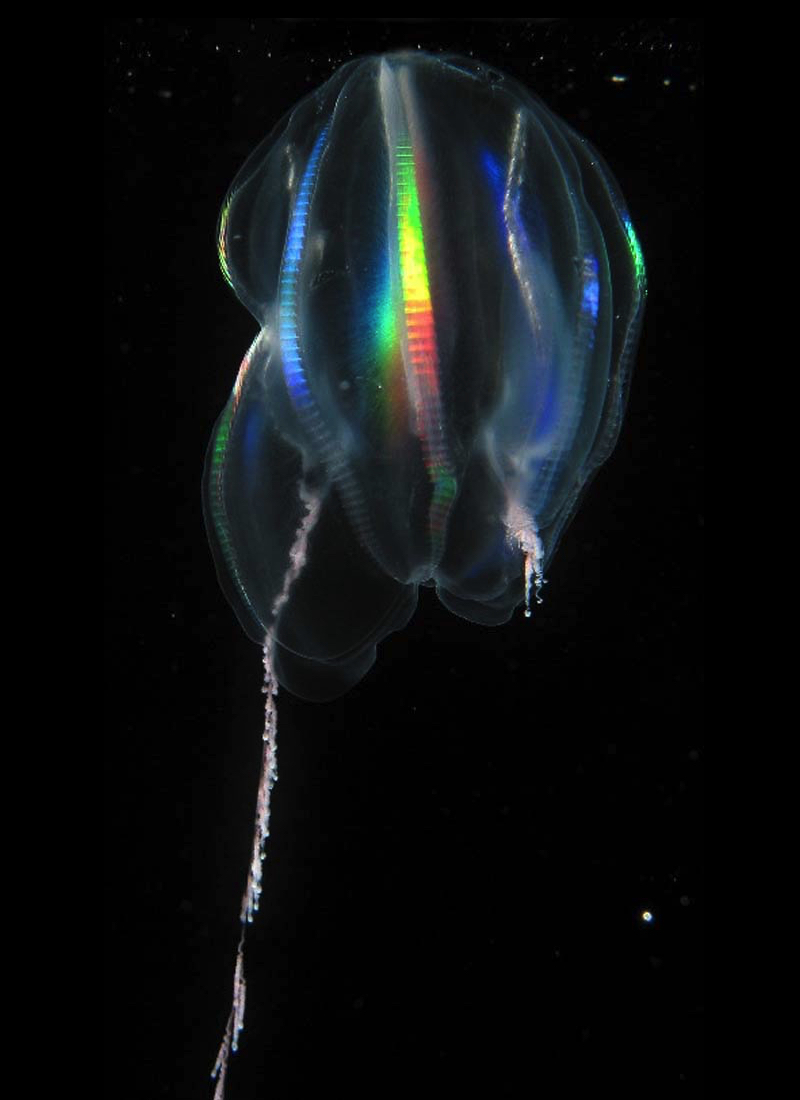
Light diffracting along the comb rows of a cydippid, left tentacle deployed, right retracted

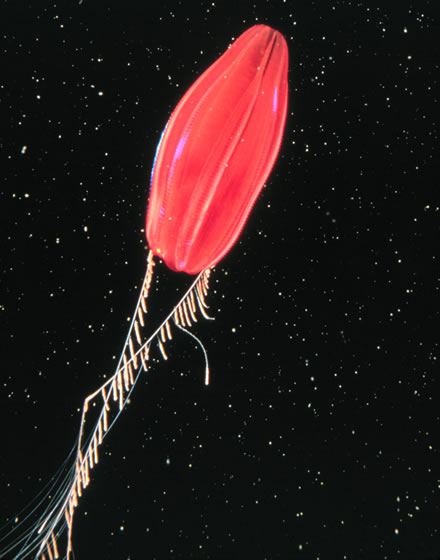
Deep-sea ctenophore trailing tentacles studded with tentilla (sub-tentacles)

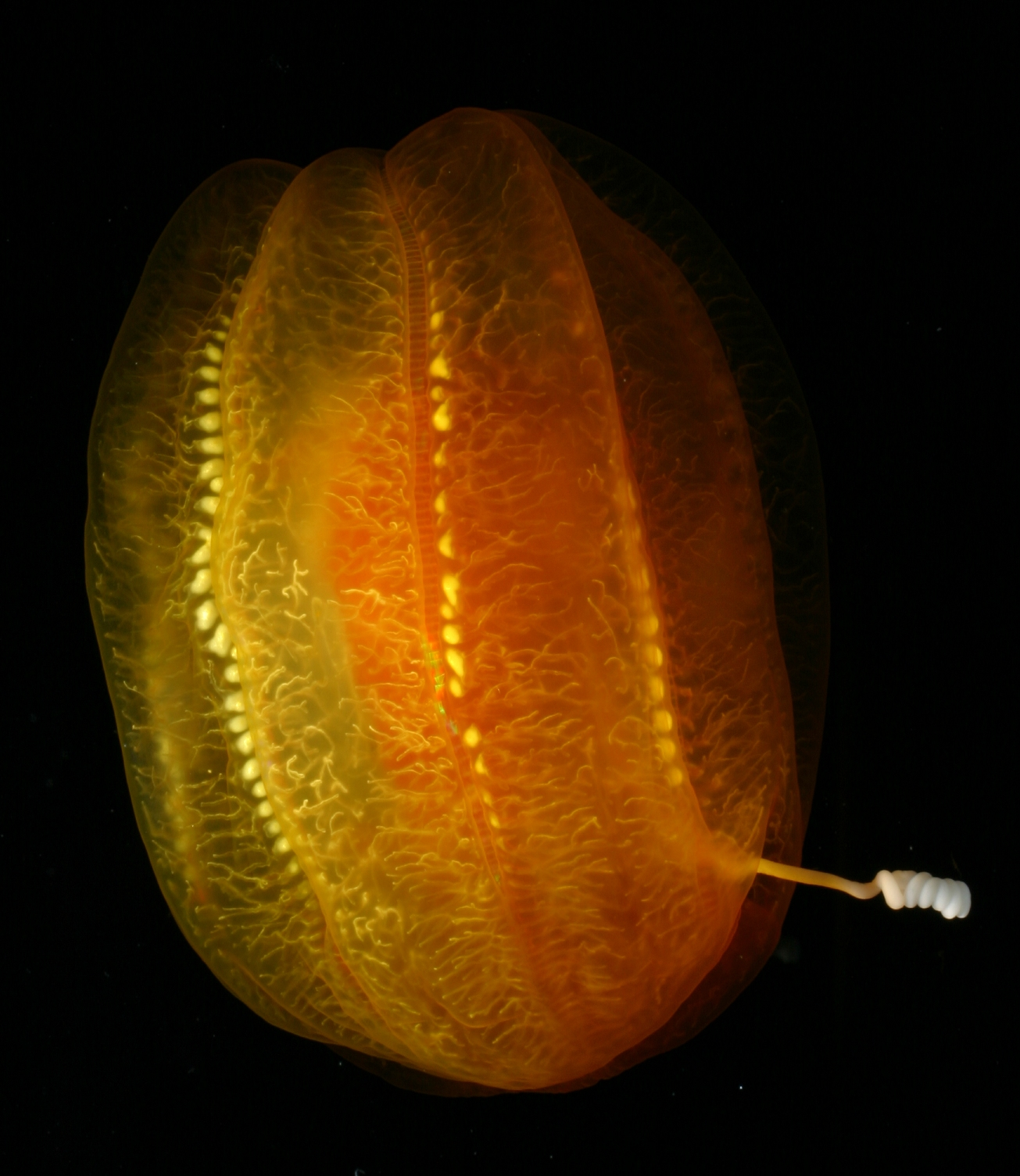
Egg-shaped cydippid ctenophore

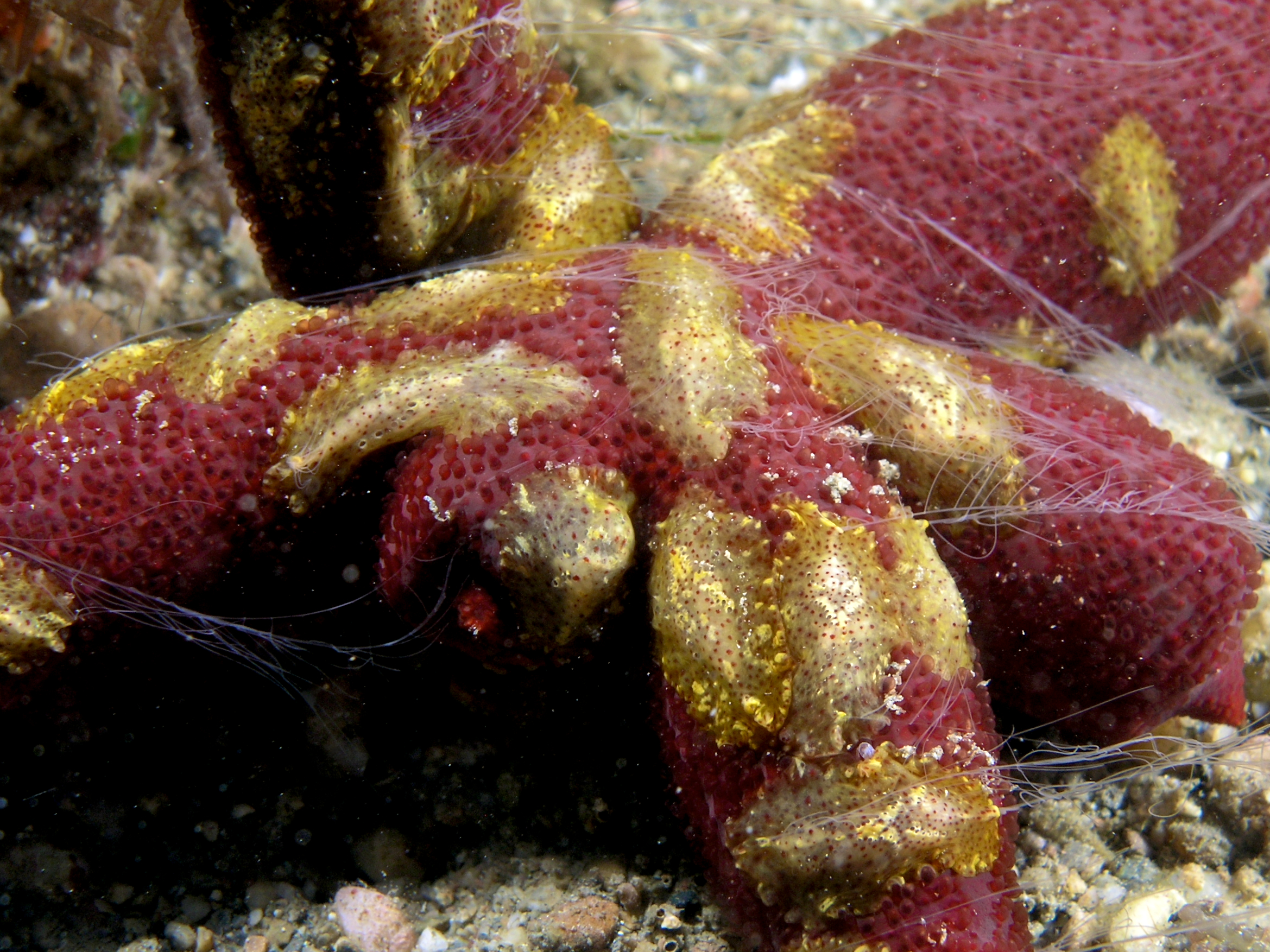
Group of small benthic creeping comb jellies streaming tentacles and living symbiotically on a starfish.

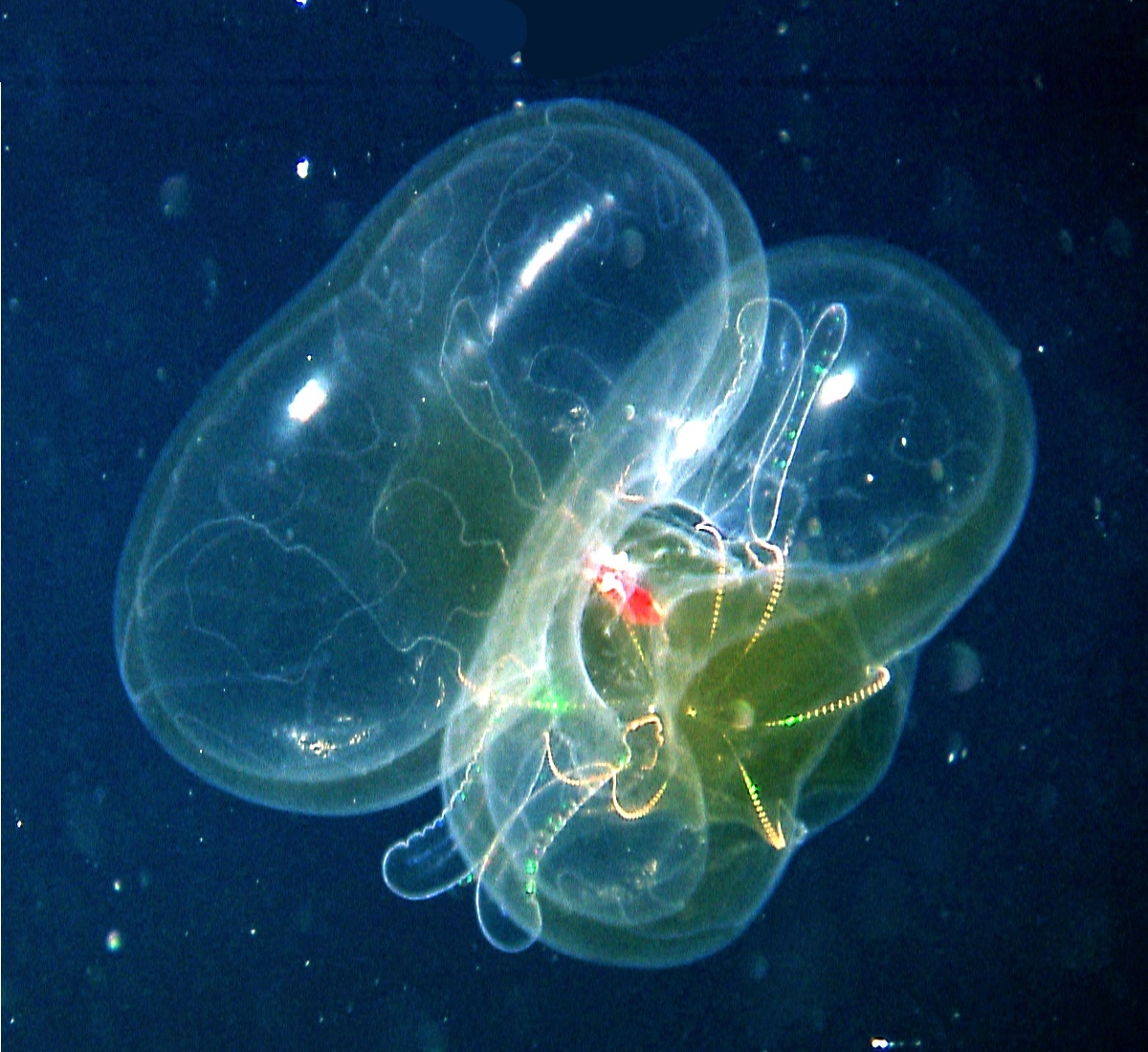
Lobata sp. with paired thick lobes

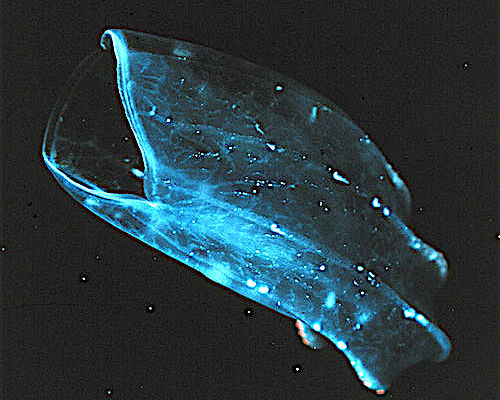
The beroid ctenophore, mouth gaping, preys on other ctenophores.

Early writers combined ctenophores with cnidarians. Ctenophores resemble cnidarians in relying on water flow through the body cavity for both digestion and respiration, as well as in having a decentralized nerve net rather than a brain. Also like cnidarians, the bodies of ctenophores consist of a mass of jelly, with one layer of cells on the outside and another lining the internal cavity. In ctenophores, however, these layers are two cells deep, while those in cnidarians are only a single cell deep. While cnidarians exhibit radial symmetry, ctenophores have two anal canals which exhibit biradial symmetry (half-turn rotational symmetry). The position of the ctenophores in the evolutionary family tree of animals has long been debated, and the majority view at present, based on molecular phylogenetics, is that cnidarians and bilaterians are more closely related to each other than either is to ctenophores.

External videos
- Iridescent red ctenophore — EVNautilus

==== Placozoa ====
Placozoa (from Greek for flat animals) have the simplest structure of all animals. They are a basal form of free-living (non-parasitic) multicellular organism that do not yet have a common name. They live in marine environments and form a phylum containing so far only three described species, of which the first, the classical Trichoplax adhaerens, was discovered in 1883. Two more species have been discovered since 2017, and genetic methods indicate this phylum has a further 100 to 200 undescribed species.

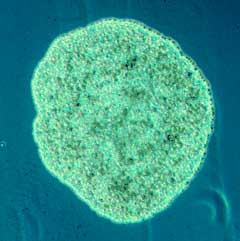
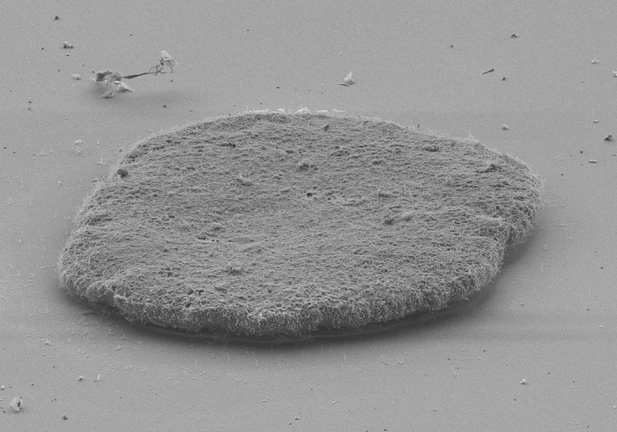
Placozoa have the simplest structure of all animals.

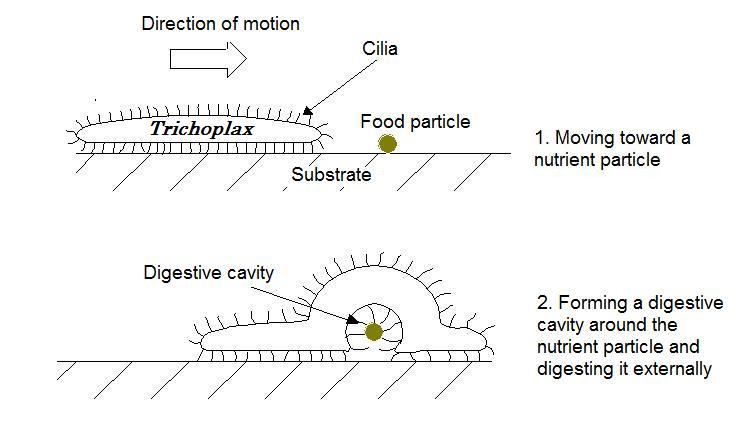
Crawling motility and food uptake by T. adhaerens

Trichoplax is a small, flattened, animal about one mm across and usually about 25 μm thick. Like the amoebae they superficially resemble, they continually change their external shape. In addition, spherical phases occasionally form which may facilitate movement. Trichoplax lacks tissues and organs. There is no manifest body symmetry, so it is not possible to distinguish anterior from posterior or left from right. It is made up of a few thousand cells of six types in three distinct layers. The outer layer of simple epithelial cells bear cilia which the animal uses to help it creep along the seafloor. Trichoplax feed by engulfing and absorbing food particles – mainly microbes and organic detritus – with their underside.

==== Marine cnidarians ====
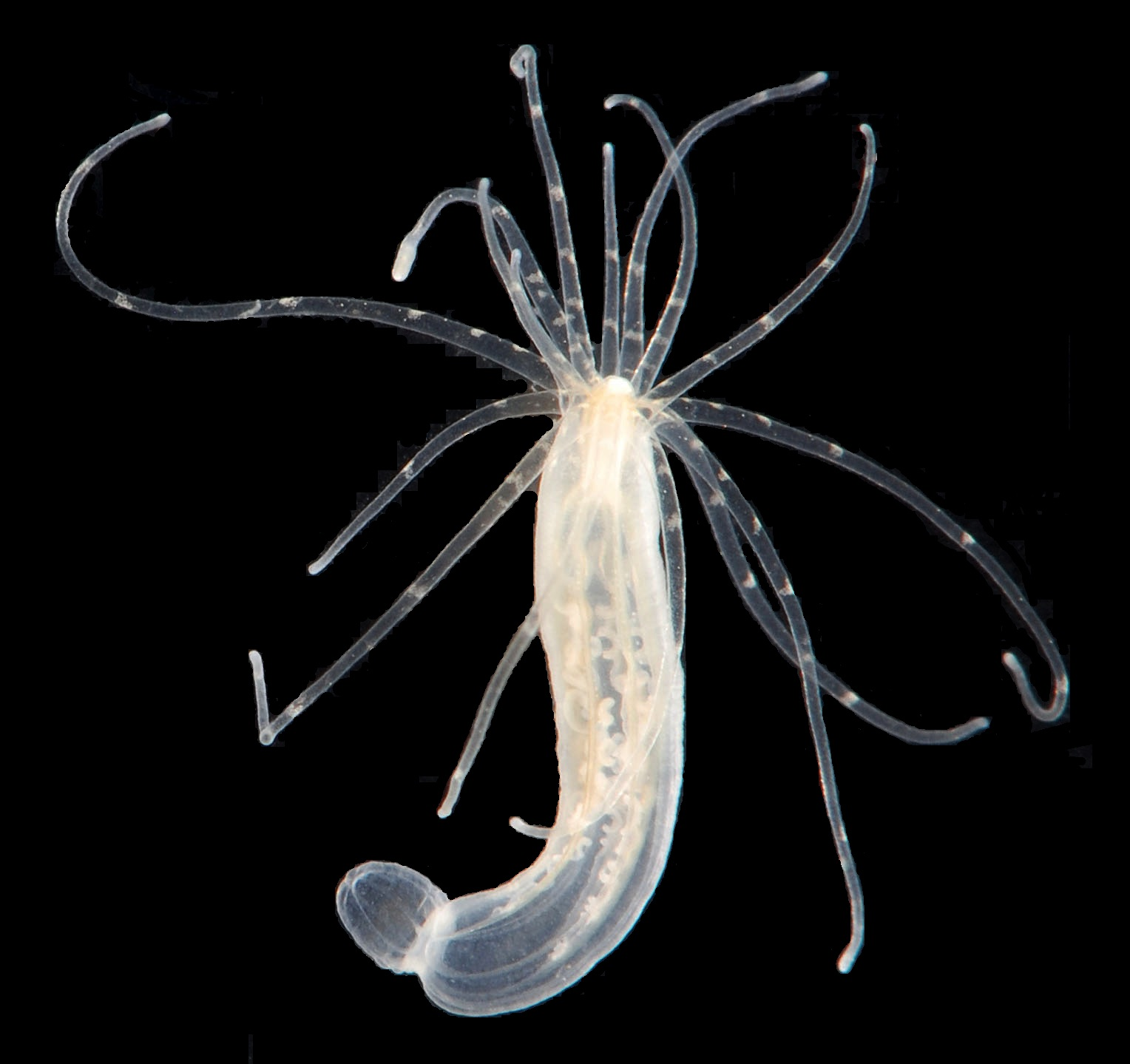
Cnidarians, like this starlet sea anemone, are the simplest animals to organise cells into tissue. Yet they have the same genes that form the vertebrate (including human) head.

Cnidarians (from Greek for nettle) are distinguished by the presence of stinging cells, specialized cells that they use mainly for capturing prey. Cnidarians include corals, sea anemones, jellyfish and hydrozoans. They form a phylum containing over 10,000 species of animals found exclusively in aquatic (mainly marine) environments. Their bodies consist of mesoglea, a non-living jelly-like substance, sandwiched between two layers of epithelium that are mostly one cell thick. They have two basic body forms: swimming medusae and sessile polyps, both of which are radially symmetrical with mouths surrounded by tentacles that bear cnidocytes. Both forms have a single orifice and body cavity that are used for digestion and respiration.

Fossil cnidarians have been found in rocks formed about 580 million years ago. Fossils of cnidarians that do not build mineralized structures are rare. Scientists currently think cnidarians, ctenophores and bilaterians are more closely related to calcareous sponges than these are to other sponges, and that anthozoans are the evolutionary "aunts" or "sisters" of other cnidarians, and the most closely related to bilaterians.

Cnidarians are the simplest animals in which the cells are organized into tissues. The starlet sea anemone is used as a model organism in research. It is easy to care for in the laboratory and a protocol has been developed which can yield large numbers of embryos on a daily basis. There is a remarkable degree of similarity in the gene sequence conservation and complexity between the sea anemone and vertebrates. In particular, genes concerned in the formation of the head in vertebrates are also present in the anemone.

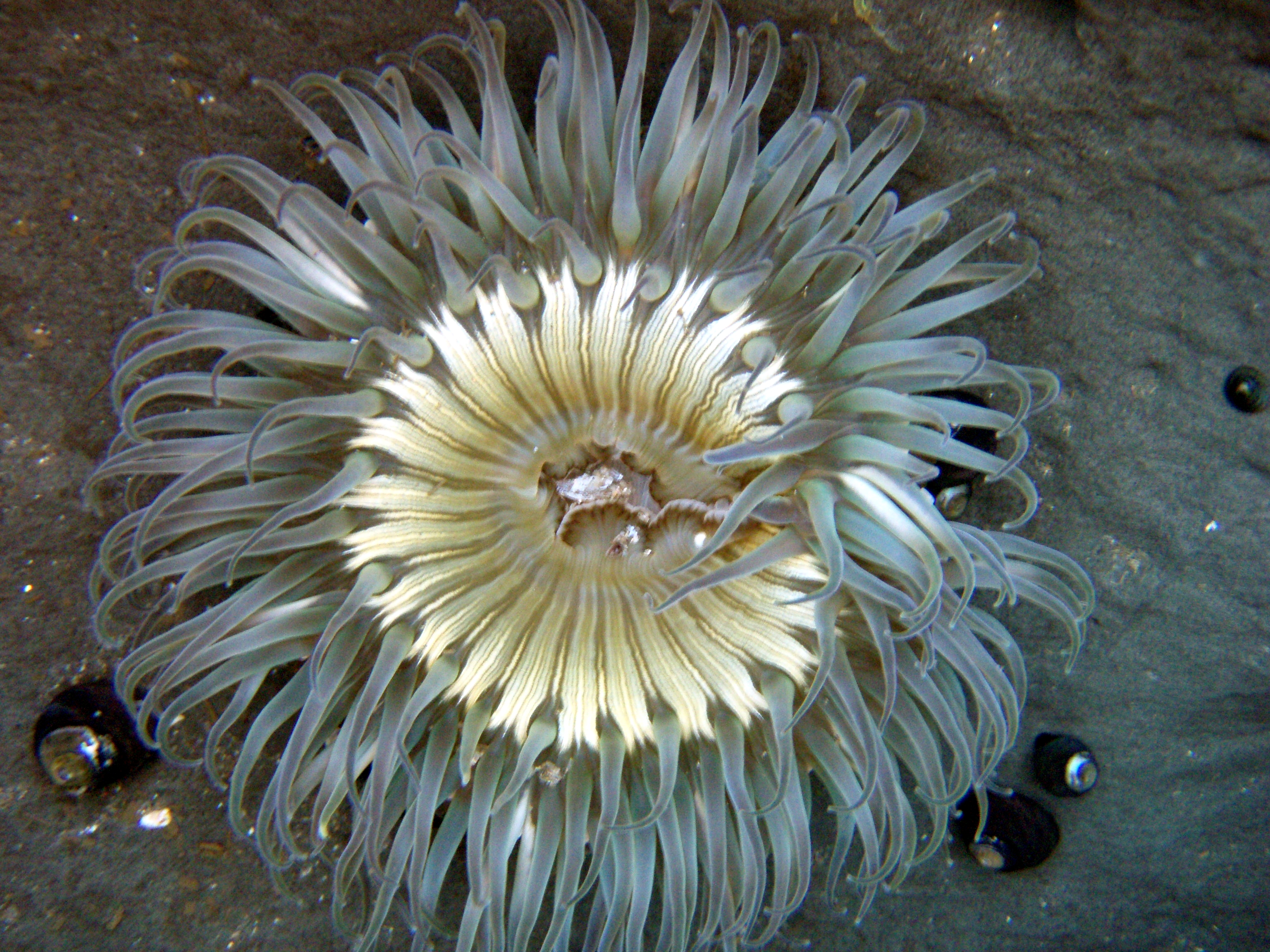
Sea anemones are common in tidepools.

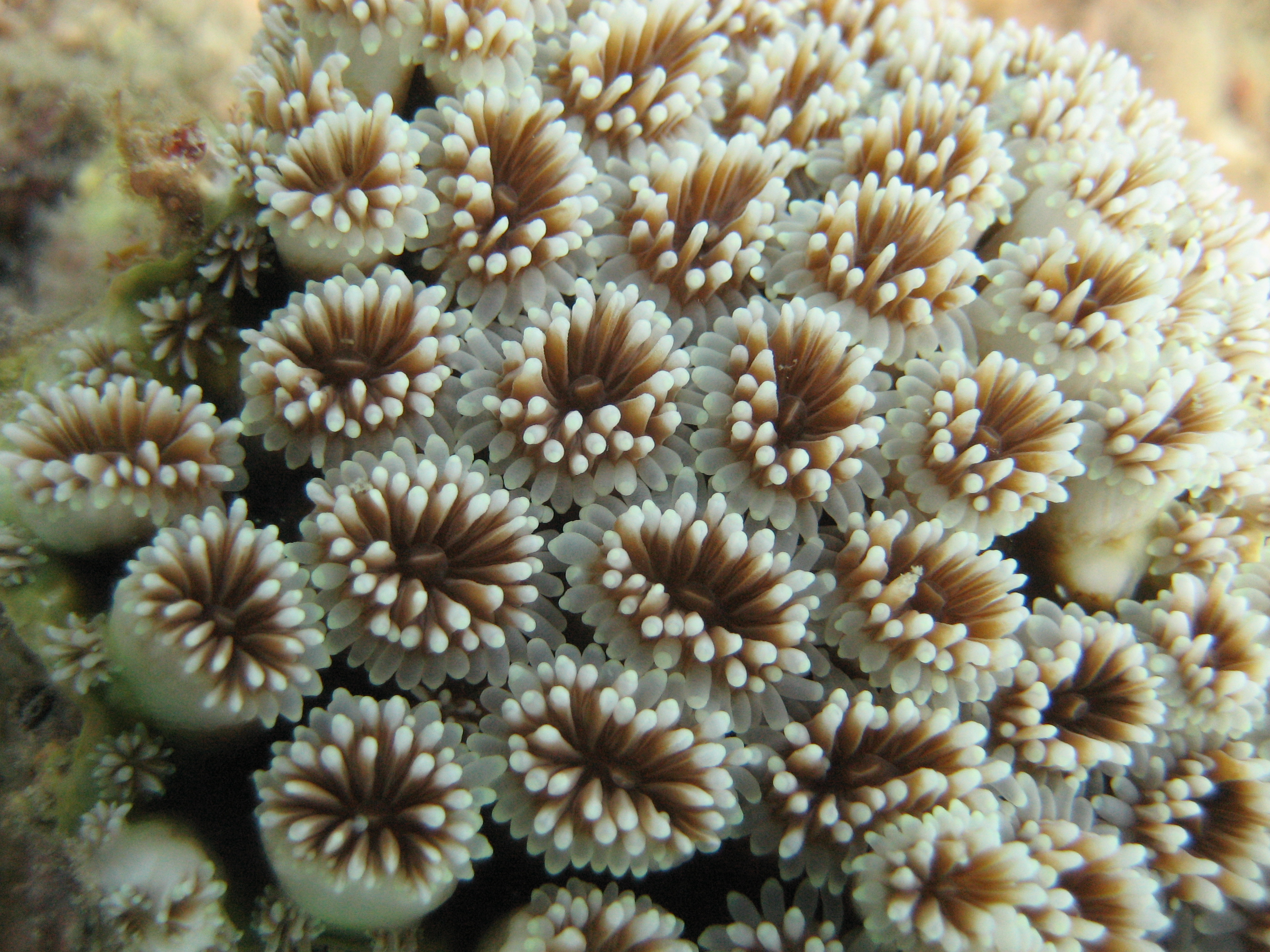
Close up of polyps on the surface of a coral, waving their tentacles.

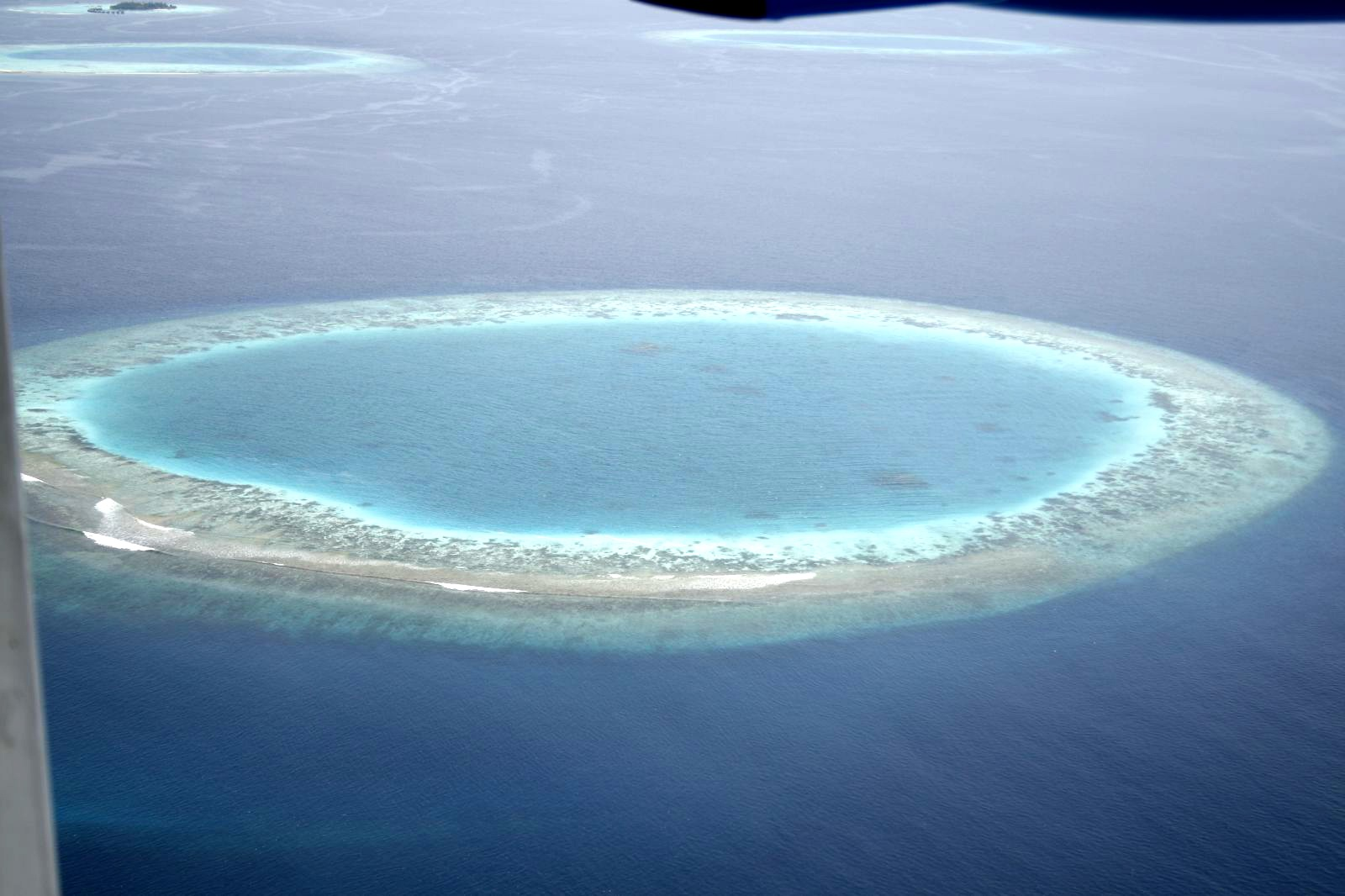
If an island sinks below the sea, coral growth can keep up with rising water and form an atoll.
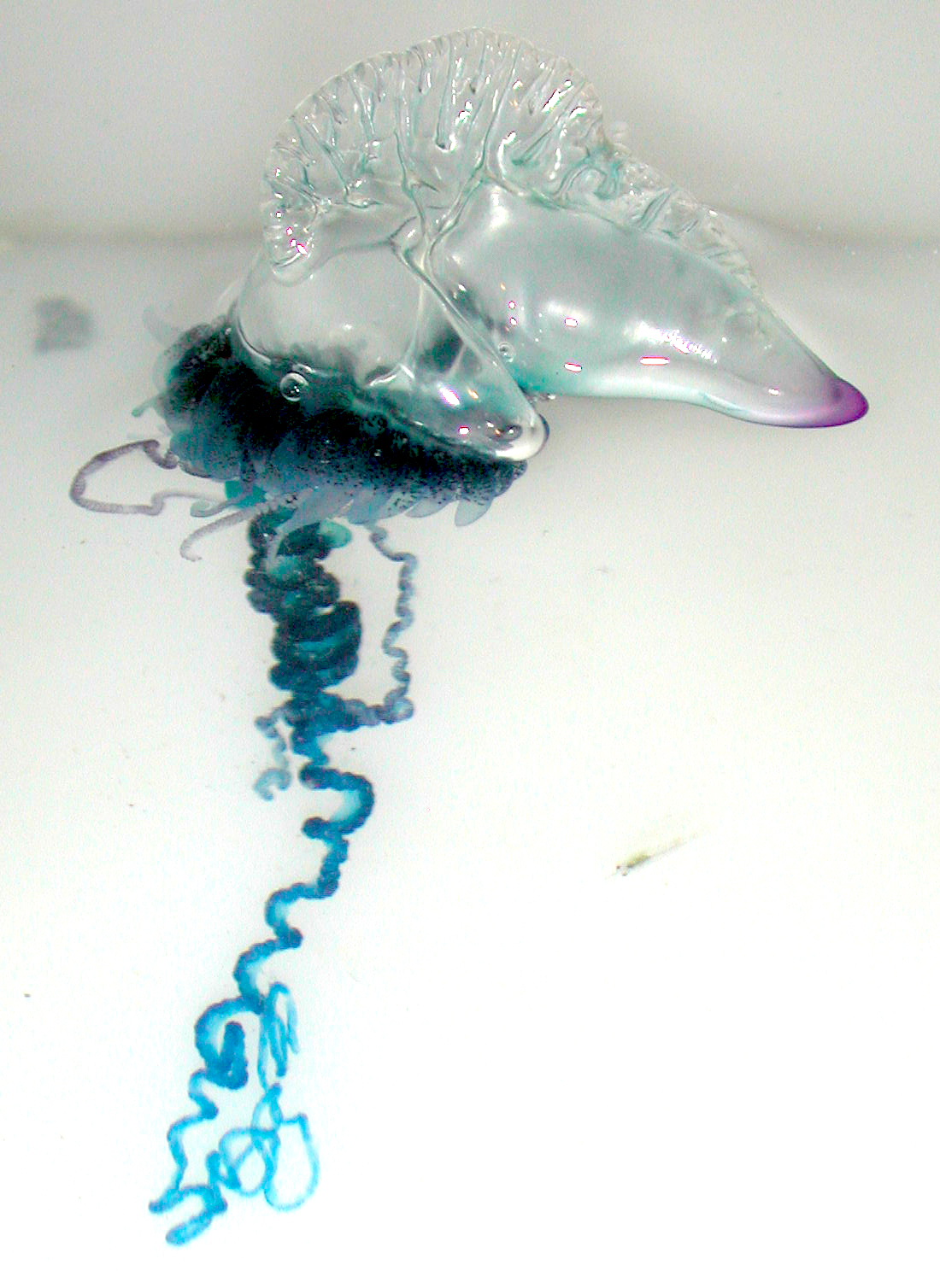
The Portuguese man o' war is a colonial siphonophore

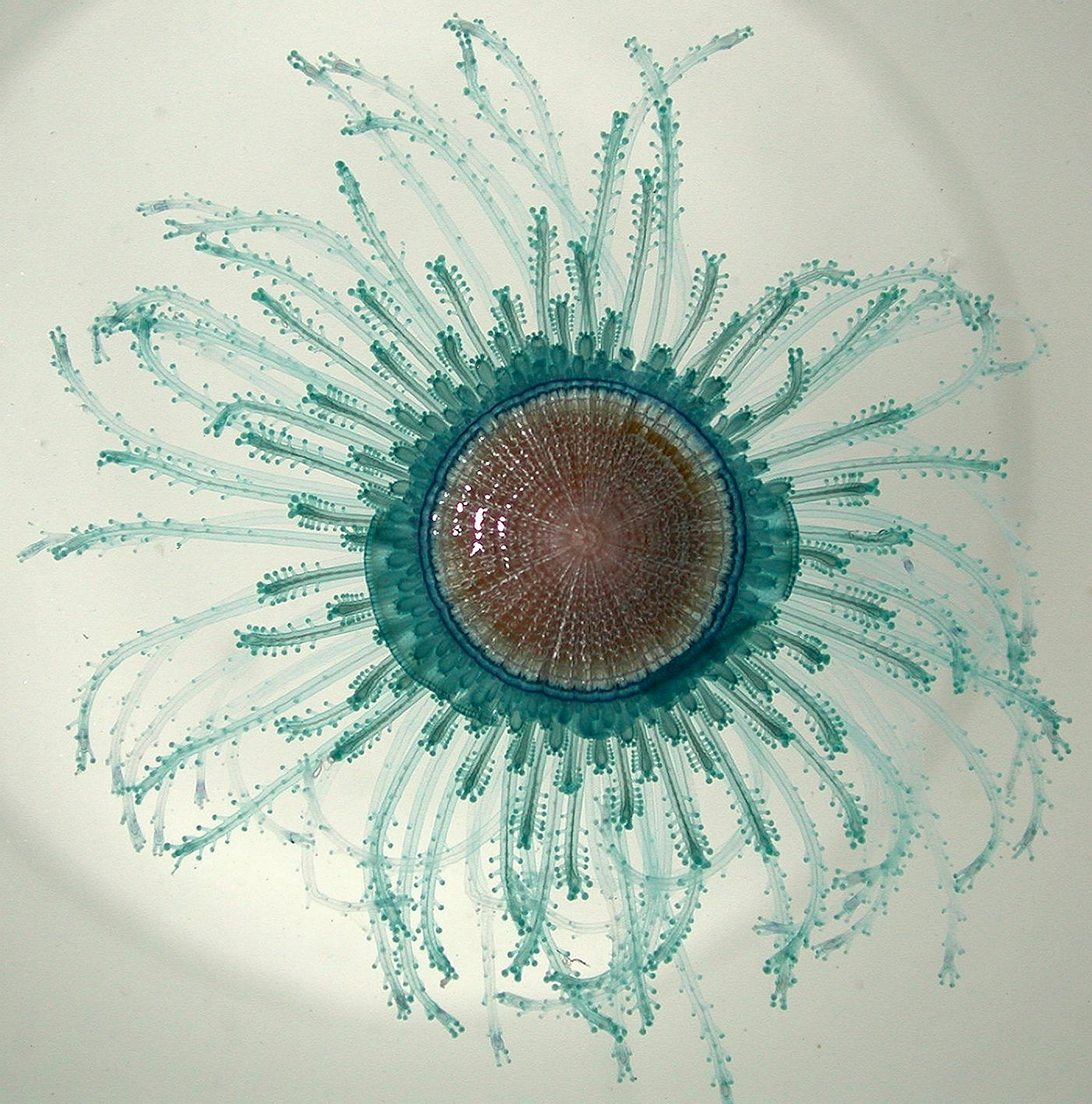
Porpita porpita consists of a colony of hydroids

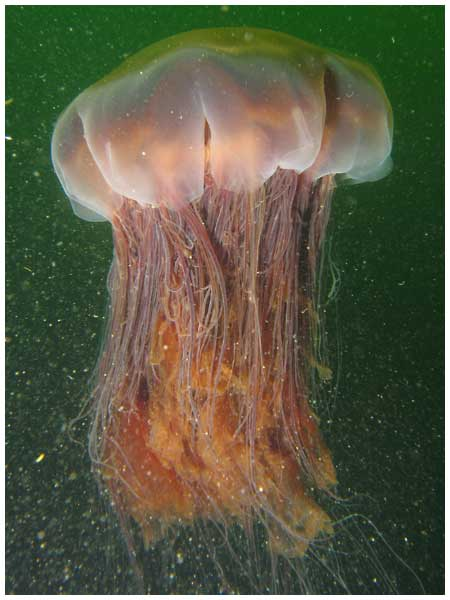
Lion's mane jellyfish, largest known jellyfish

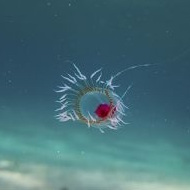
Turritopsis dohrnii achieves biological immortality by transferring its cells back to childhood.

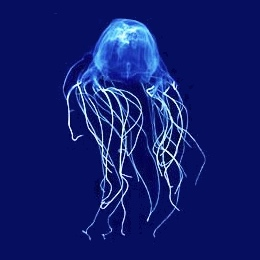
The sea wasp is the most lethal jellyfish in the world.

== Bilateral invertebrate animals ==
Idealised wormlike bilaterian body plan. With a cylindrical body and a direction of movement the animal has head and tail ends. Sense organs and mouth form the basis of the head. Opposed circular and longitudinal muscles enable peristaltic motion.

Some of the earliest bilaterians were wormlike, and the original bilaterian may have been a bottom dwelling worm with a single body opening. A bilaterian body can be conceptualized as a cylinder with a gut running between two openings, the mouth and the anus. Around the gut it has an internal body cavity, a coelom or pseudocoelom. (Note: The earliest Bilateria may have had only a single opening, and no coelom.) Animals with this bilaterally symmetric body plan have a head (anterior) end and a tail (posterior) end as well as a back (dorsal) and a belly (ventral); therefore they also have a left side and a right side.

Having a front end means that this part of the body encounters stimuli, such as food, favoring cephalisation, the development of a head with sense organs and a mouth. The body stretches back from the head, and many bilaterians have a combination of circular muscles that constrict the body, making it longer, and an opposing set of longitudinal muscles, that shorten the body; these enable soft-bodied animals with a hydrostatic skeleton to move by peristalsis. They also have a gut that extends through the basically cylindrical body from mouth to anus. Many bilaterian phyla have primary larvae which swim with cilia and have an apical organ containing sensory cells. However, there are exceptions to each of these characteristics; for example, adult echinoderms are radially symmetric (unlike their larvae), and certain parasitic worms have extremely simplified body structures.

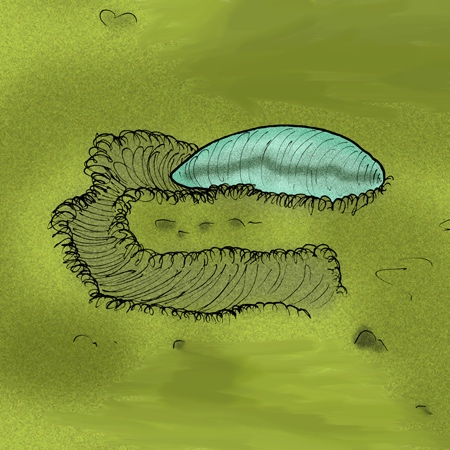
Ikaria wariootia, an early bilaterian

- ← bilaterians
  - Xenacoelomorpha
    - basal bilaterians (lack a true gut)
  - Nephrozoa
    - protostomes 610 mya
      - develops mouth first →
    - deuterostomes 650 mya
      - develops anus first →

=== Protostomes ===
Protostomes (from Greek for first mouth) are a superphylum of animals. It is a sister clade of the deuterostomes (from Greek for second mouth), with which it forms the Nephrozoa clade. Protostomes are distinguished from deuterostomes by the way their embryos develop. In protostomes the first opening that develops becomes the mouth, while in deuterostomes it becomes the anus.

- ← Protostomes (extant)
  - Ecdysozoa >529 mya
    - Scalidophora penis worms and mud dragons
    - - arthropods mainly crustaceans
      - nematodes roundworms
  - Spiralia
    - Gnathifera
      - rotifers
      - arrow worms
    - Platytrochozoa 580 mya
      - flatworms
      - Lophotrochozoa 550 mya
        - molluscs gastropods, bivalves and cephalopods
        - ringed worms

==== Marine worms ====
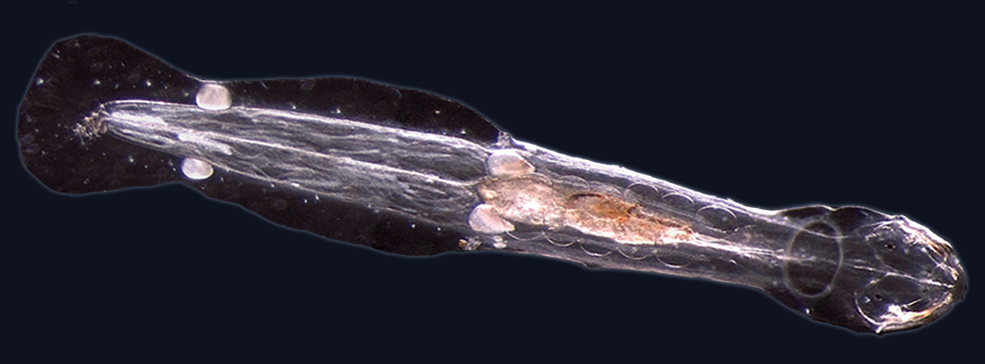
Many marine worms are related only distantly, so they form a number of different phyla. The worm shown is an arrow worm, found worldwide as a predatory component of plankton.

Worms (Old English for serpents) form a number of phyla. Different groups of marine worms are related only distantly, so they are found in several different phyla such as the Annelida (segmented worms), Chaetognatha (arrow worms), Phoronida (horseshoe worms), and Hemichordata. All worms, apart from the Hemichordata, are protostomes. The Hemichordata are deuterostomes and are discussed in their own section below.

The typical body plan of a worm involves long cylindrical tube-like bodies and no limbs. Marine worms vary in size from microscopic to over 1 metre (3.3 ft) in length for some marine polychaete worms (bristle worms) and up to 58 metres (190 ft) for the marine nemertean worm (bootlace worm). Some marine worms occupy a small variety of parasitic niches, living inside the bodies of other animals, while others live more freely in the marine environment or by burrowing underground. Many of these worms have specialized tentacles used for exchanging oxygen and carbon dioxide and also may be used for reproduction. Some marine worms are tube worms, such as the giant tube worm which lives in waters near underwater volcanoes and can withstand temperatures up to 90 degrees Celsius. Platyhelminthes (flatworms) form another worm phylum which includes a class of parasitic tapeworms. The marine tapeworm Polygonoporus giganticus, found in the gut of sperm whales, can grow to over 30 metres (98 feet).

Nematodes (roundworms) constitute a further worm phylum with tubular digestive systems and an opening at both ends. Over 25,000 nematode species have been described, of which more than half are parasitic. It has been estimated that another million are beyond our current knowledge. They are ubiquitous in marine, freshwater and terrestrial environments, where they often outnumber other animals in both individual and species counts. They are found in every part of the Earth's lithosphere, from the top of mountains to the bottom of oceanic trenches. By count they represent 90% of all animals on the ocean floor. Their numerical dominance, often exceeding a million individuals per square meter and accounting for about 80% of all individual animals on Earth, their diversity of life cycles, and their presence at various trophic levels point at an important role in many ecosystems.

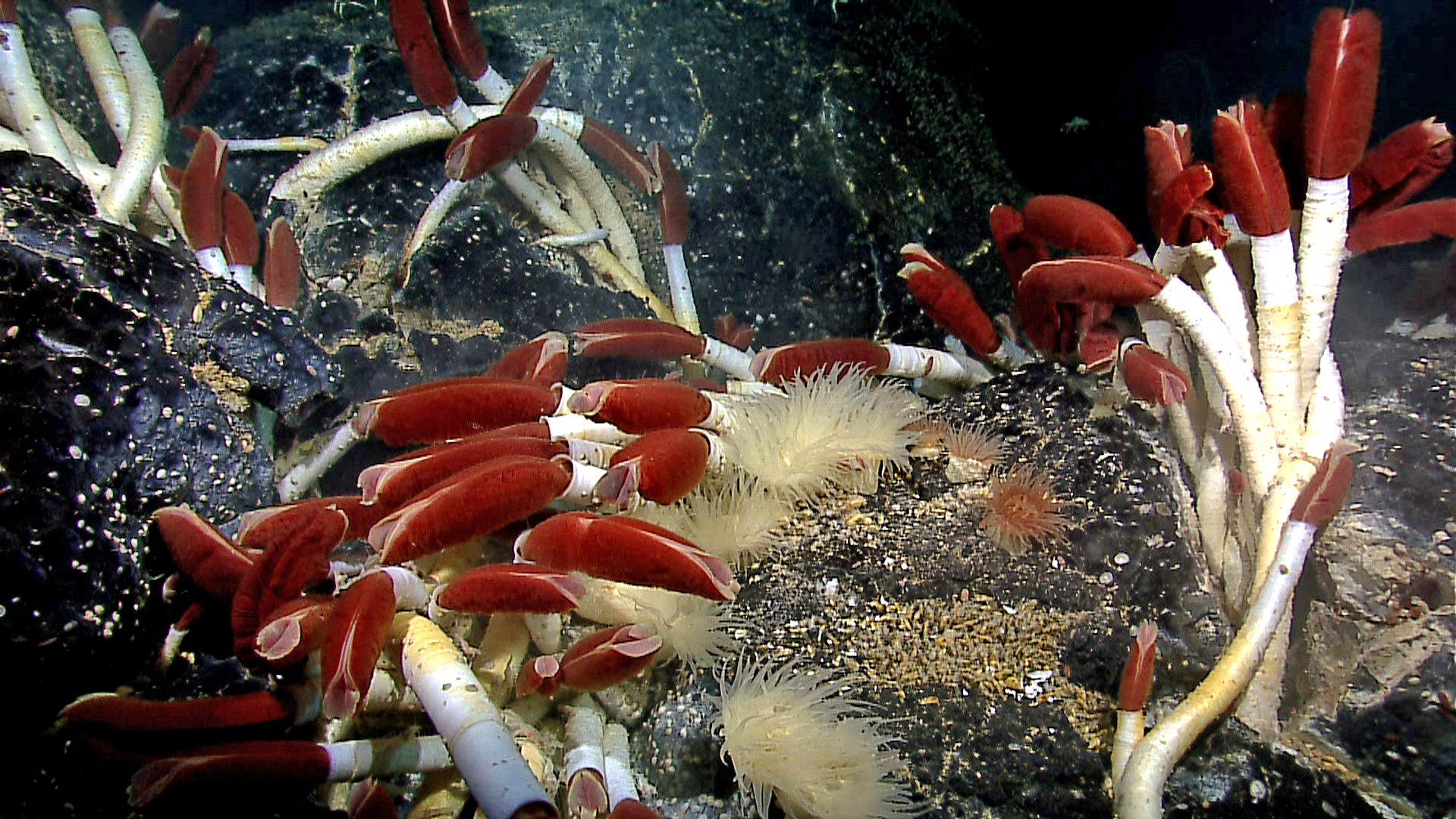
Giant tube worms cluster around hydrothermal vents.

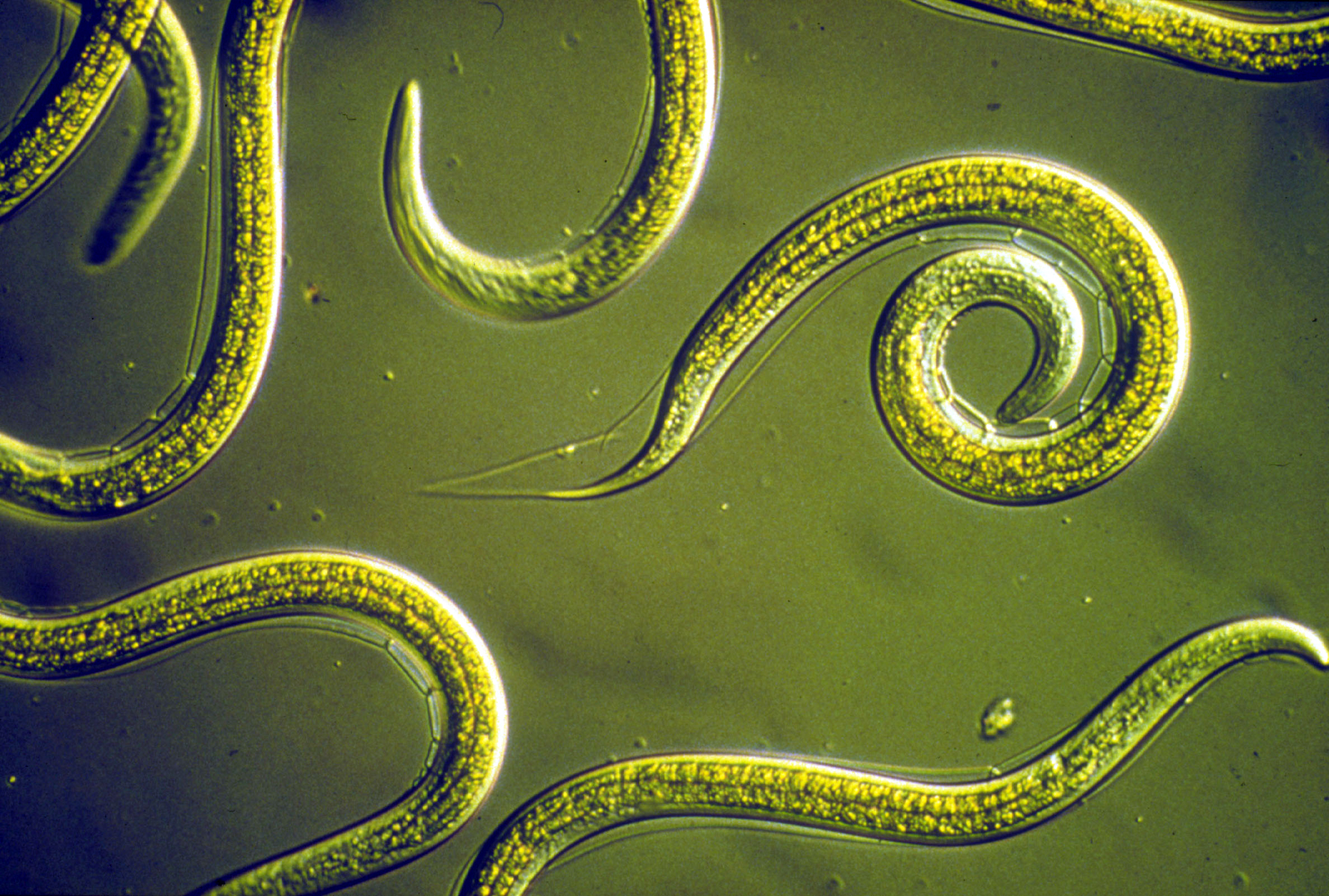
Nematodes are ubiquitous pseudocoelomates which can parasite marine plants and animals.

==== Marine molluscs ====
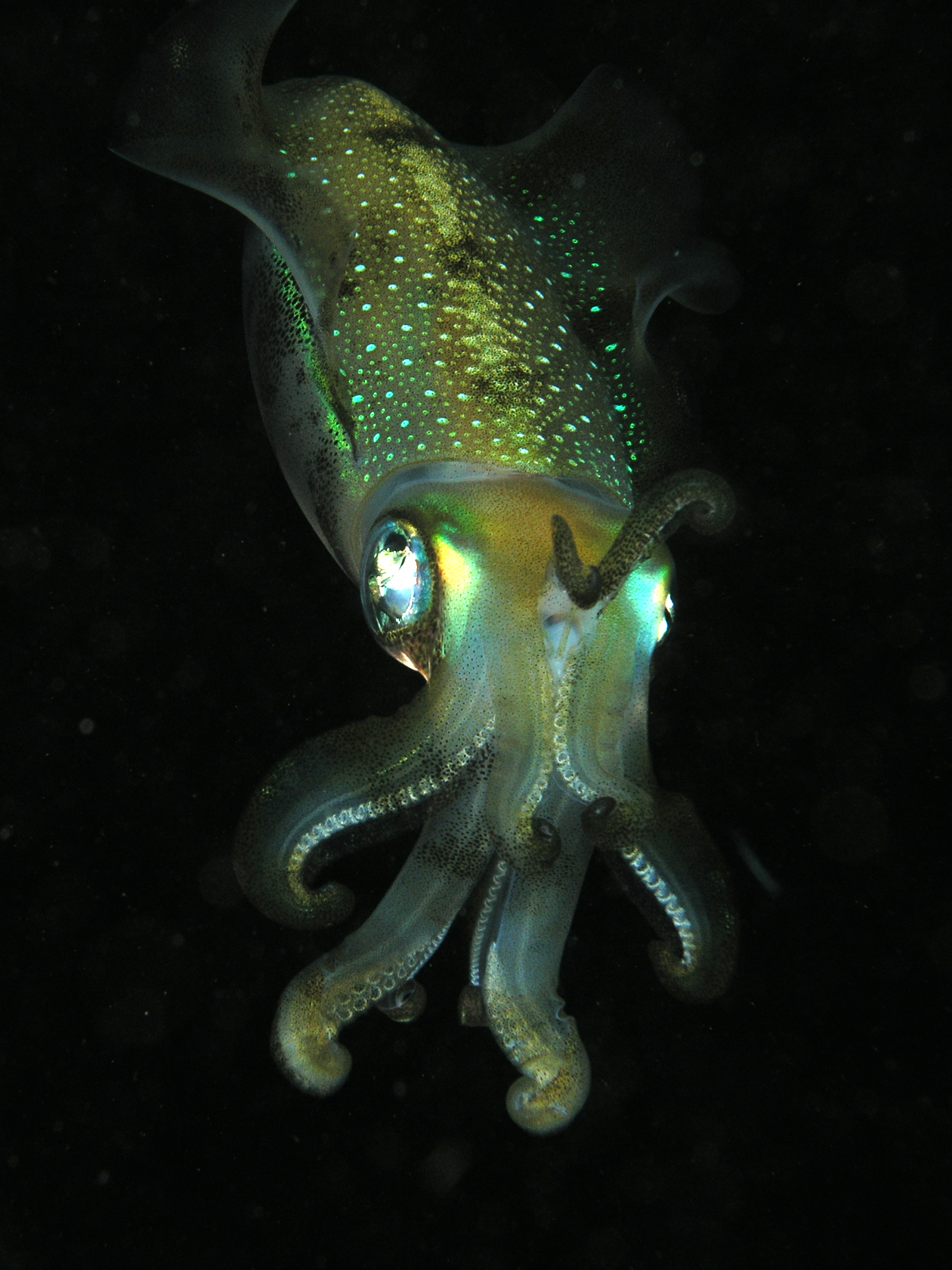
Bigfin reef squid displaying vivid iridescence at night. Cephalopods are the most neurologically advanced invertebrates.

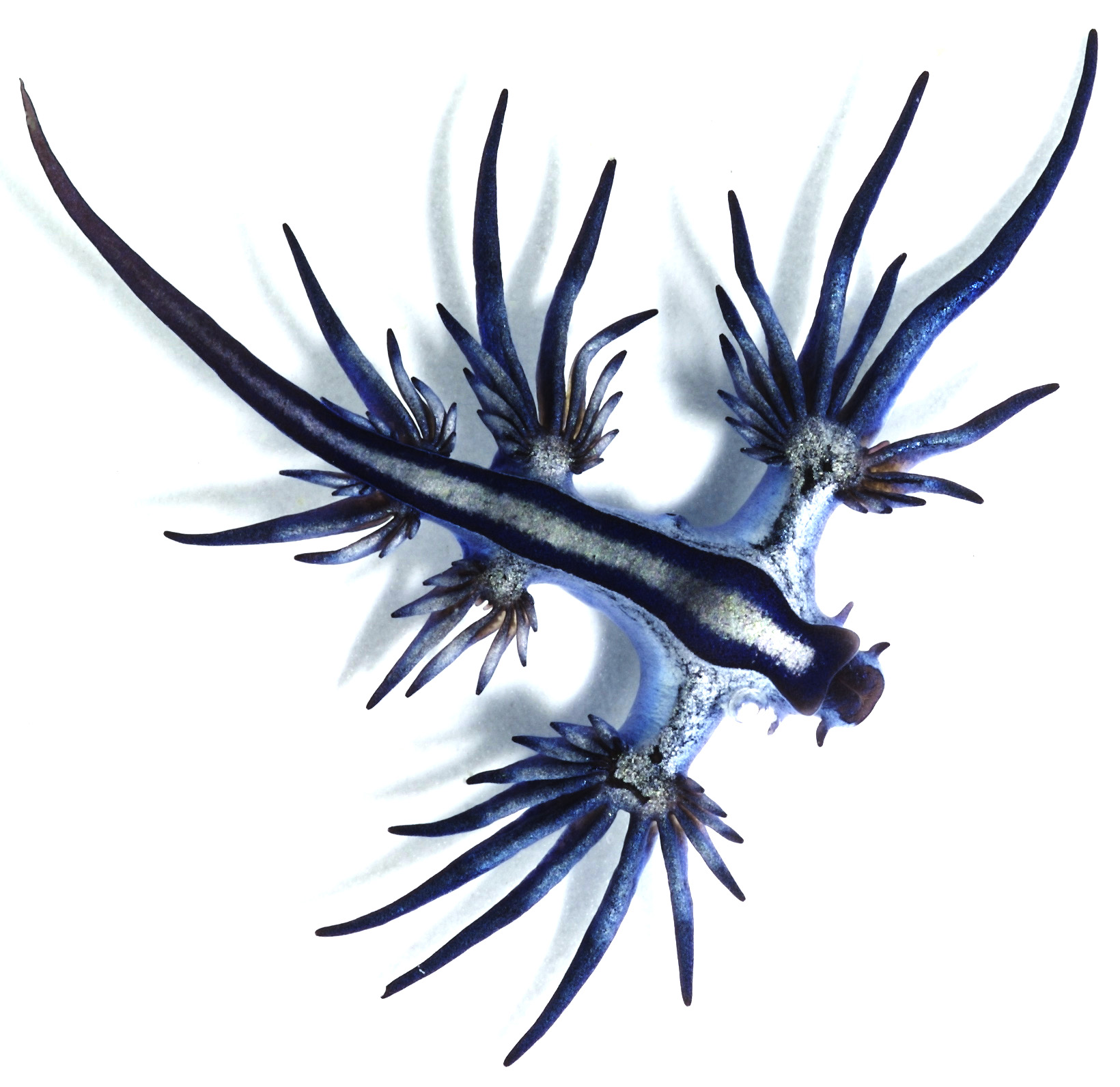
Blue dragon, a pelagic sea slug

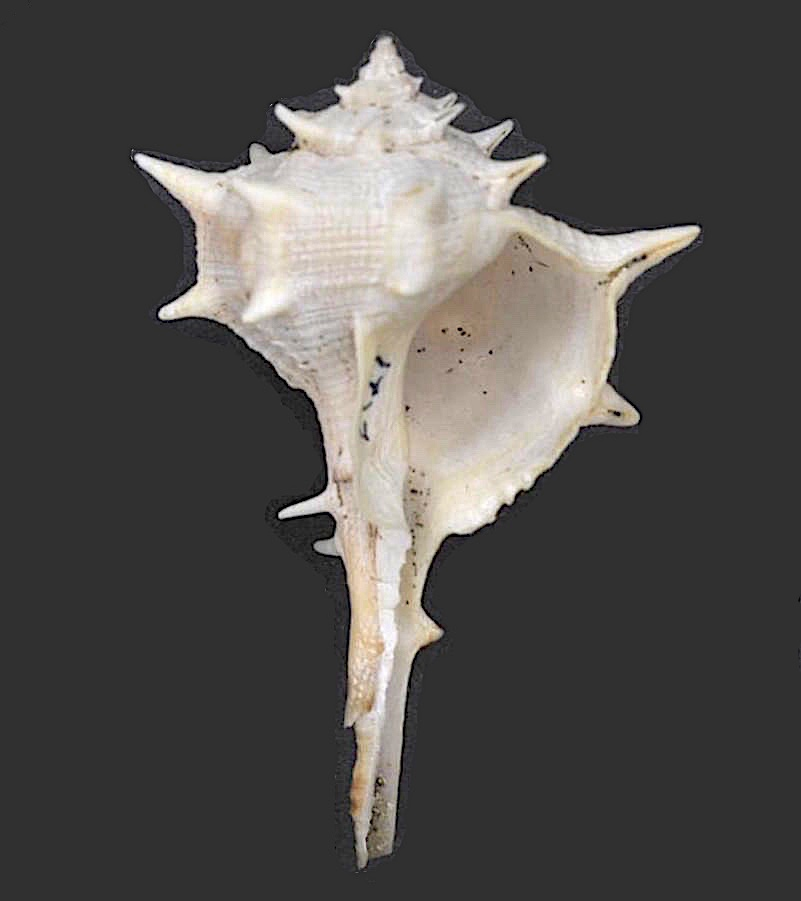
Bolinus brandaris, a sea snail from which the Phoenicians extracted royal Tyrian purple dye colour code: #66023C _____

Hypothetical ancestral mollusc

Molluscs (Latin for soft) form a phylum with about 85,000 extant recognized species. They are the largest marine phylum in terms of species count, containing about 23% of all the named marine organisms. Molluscs have more varied forms than other invertebrate phyla. They are highly diverse, not just in size and in anatomical structure, but also in behavior and in habitat.

The mollusc phylum is divided into 9 or 10 taxonomic classes. These classes include gastropods, bivalves and cephalopods, as well as other lesser-known but distinctive classes. Gastropods with protective shells are referred to as snails, whereas gastropods without protective shells are referred to as slugs. Gastropods are by far the most numerous molluscs in terms of species. Bivalves include clams, oysters, cockles, mussels, scallops, and numerous other families. There are about 8,000 marine bivalves species (including brackish water and estuarine species). A deep sea ocean quahog clam has been reported as having lived 507 years making it the longest recorded life of all animals apart from colonial animals, or near-colonial animals like sponges.

Gastropods and bivalves

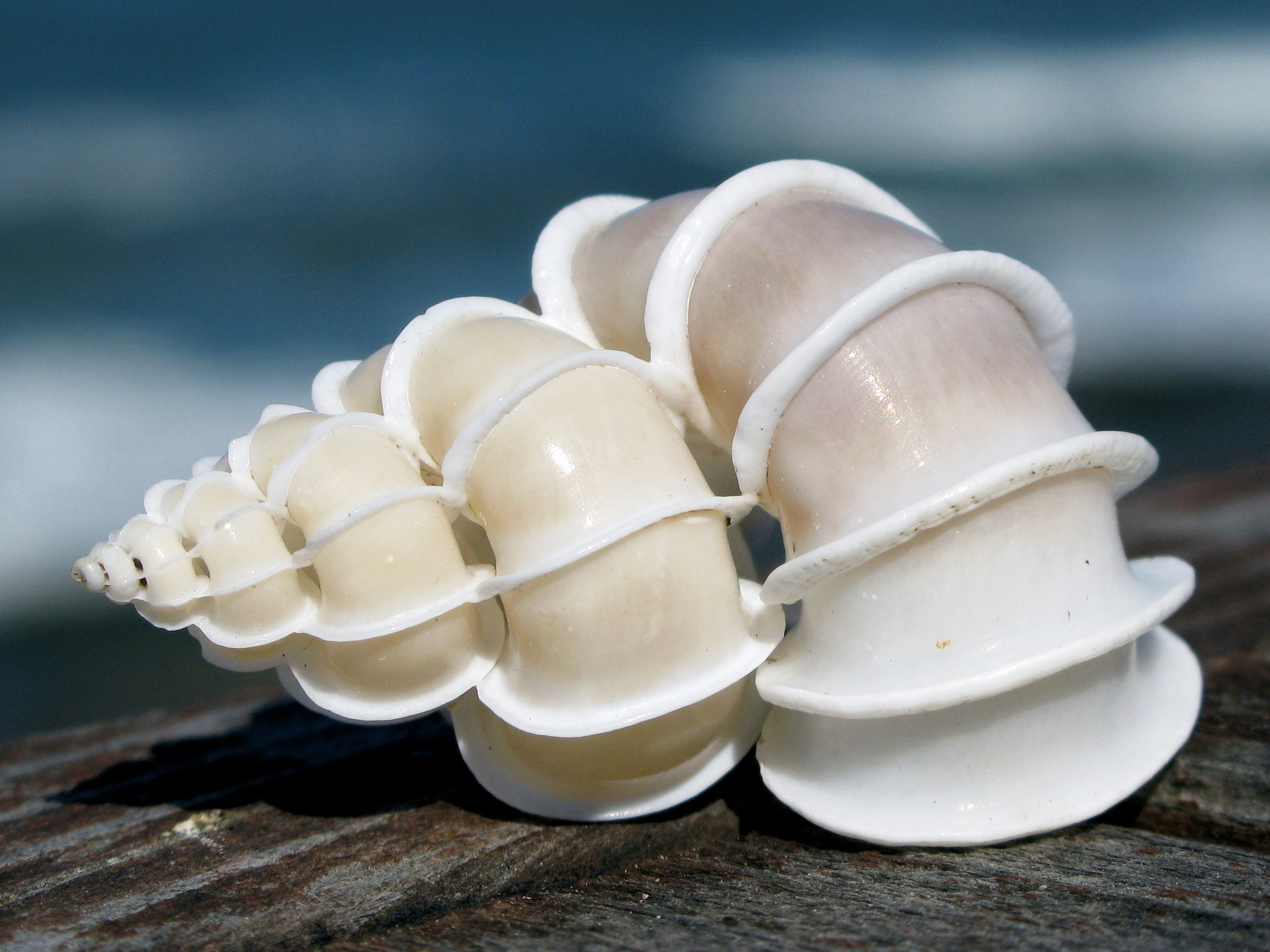
Epitonium scalare. This marine snail's shell is covetted by men.

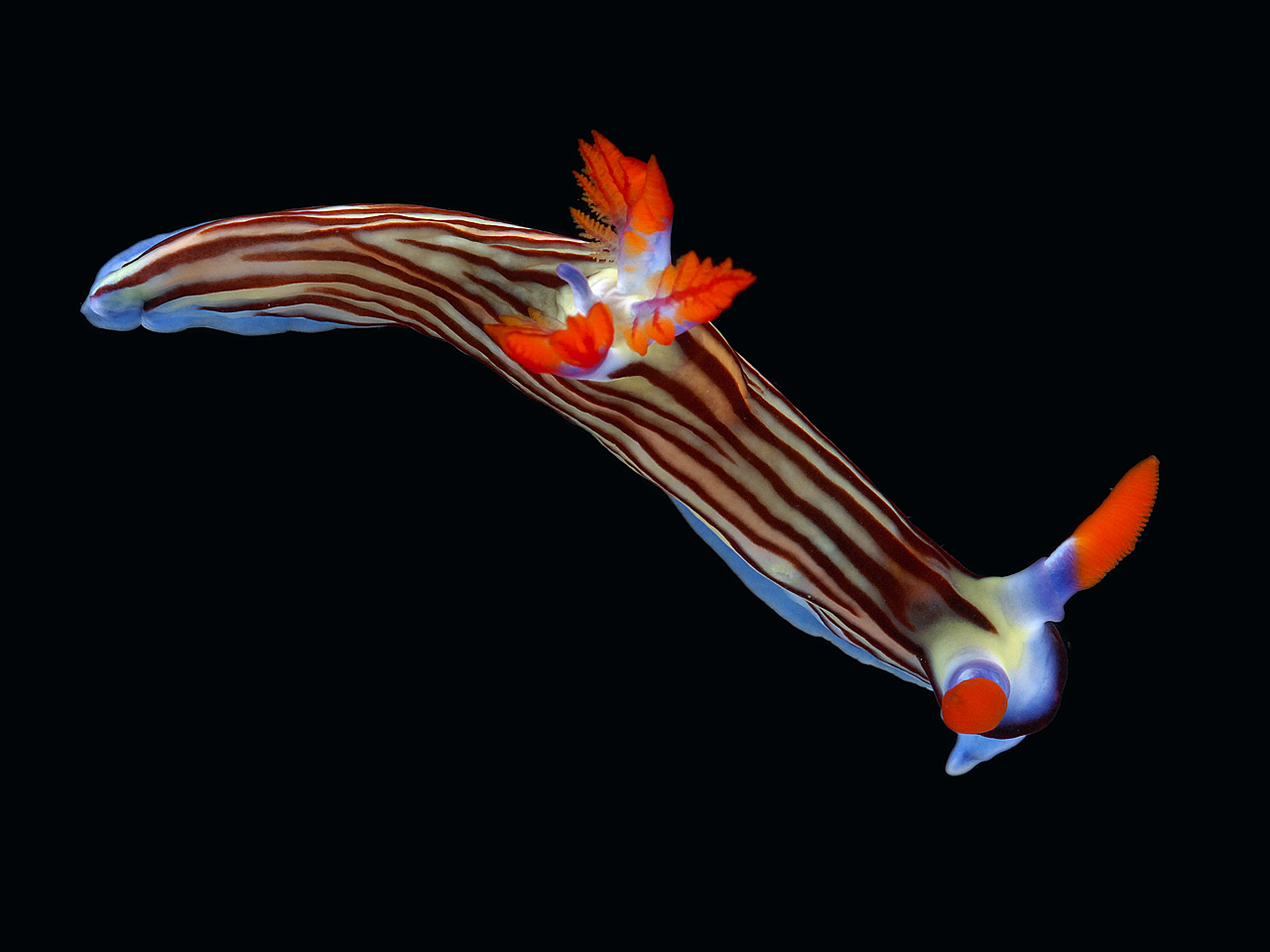
Marine gastropods are sea snails or sea slugs. This nudibranch is a sea slug.

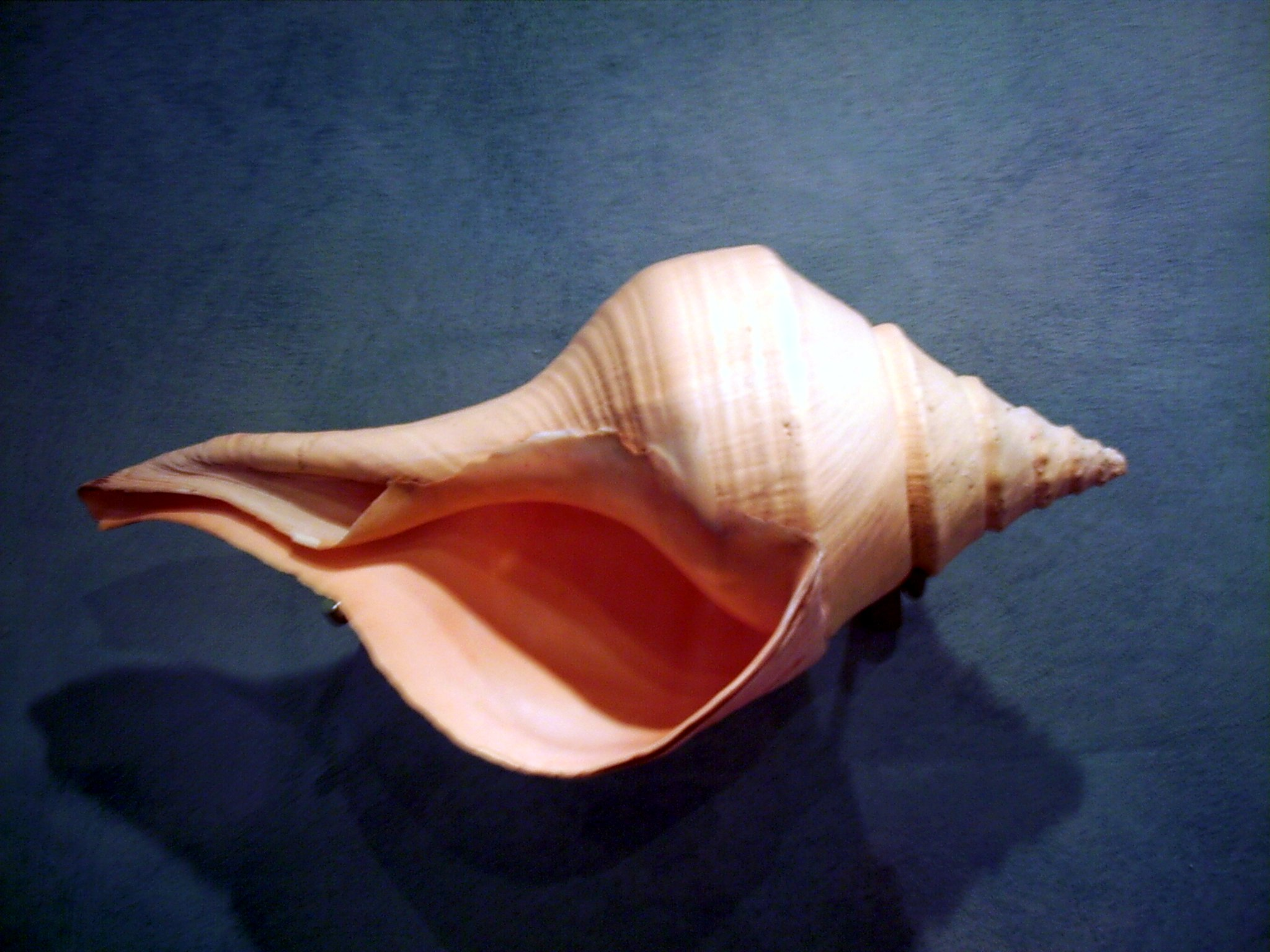
The sea snail Syrinx aruanus has a shell up to 91 cm long, the largest of any living gastropod.

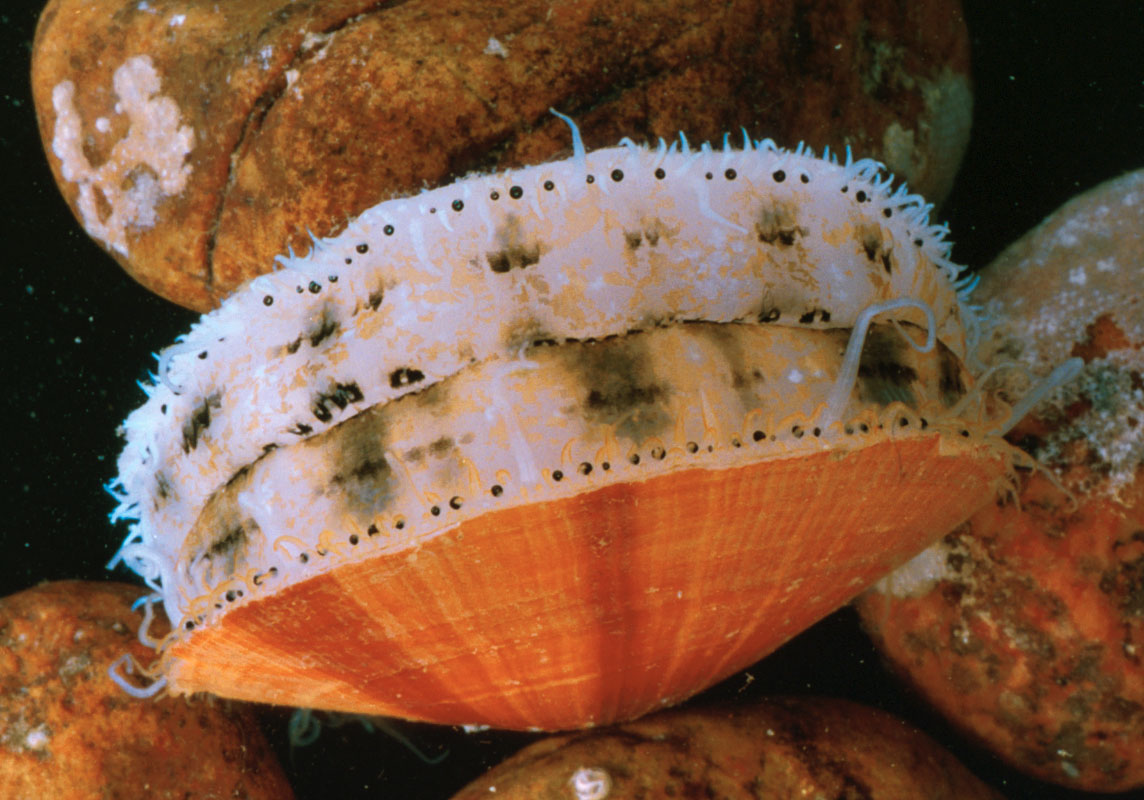
Molluscs usually have eyes. Bordering the edge of the mantle of a scallop, a bivalve mollusc, can be over 100 simple eyes.

Cephalopods include octopus, squid and cuttlefish. About 800 living species of marine cephalopods have been identified, and an estimated 11,000 extinct taxa have been described. They are found in all oceans, but there are no fully freshwater cephalopods.

Cephalopods

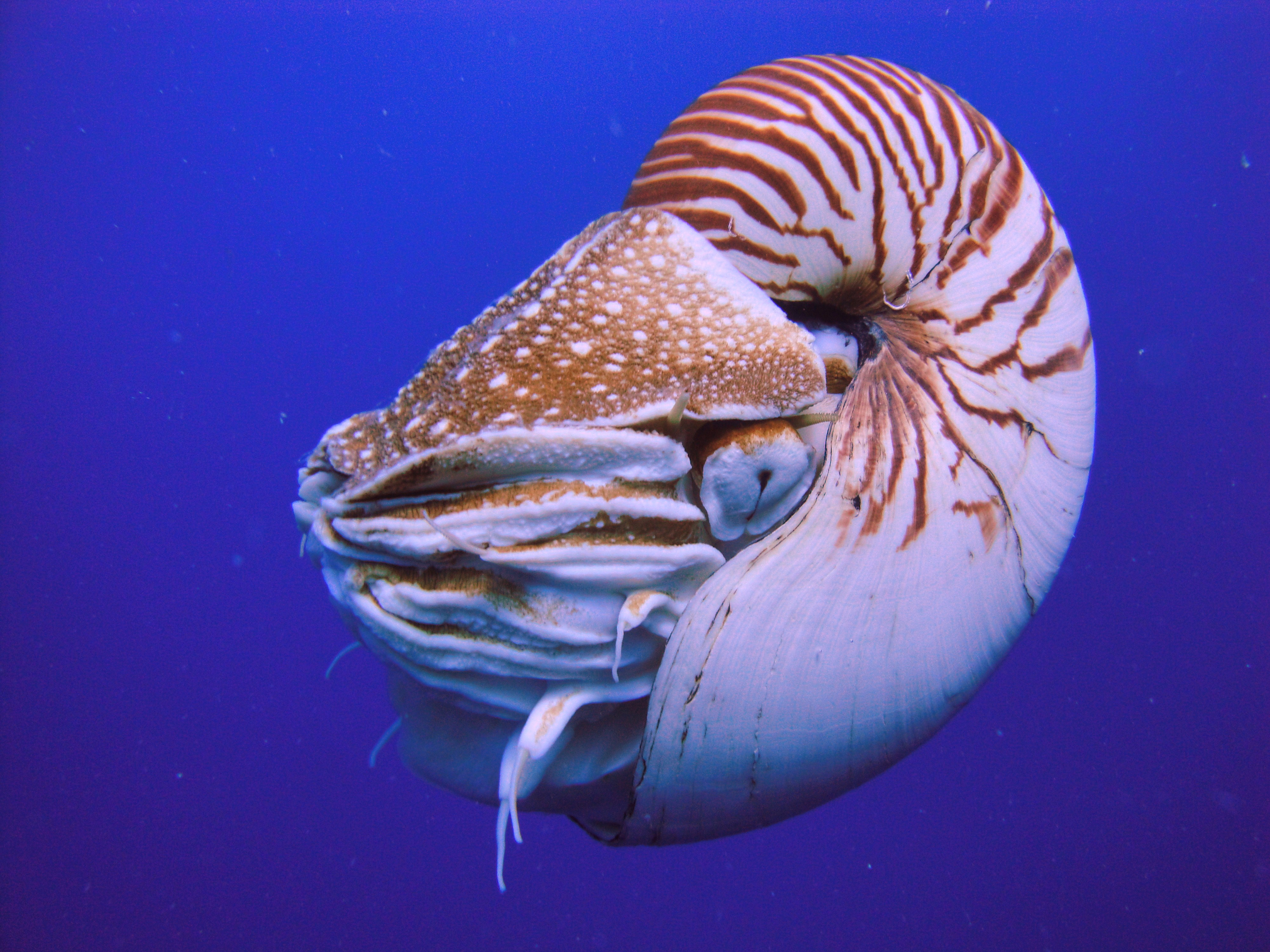
The nautilus is a living fossil little changed since it evolved 500 million years ago as one of the first cephalopods.

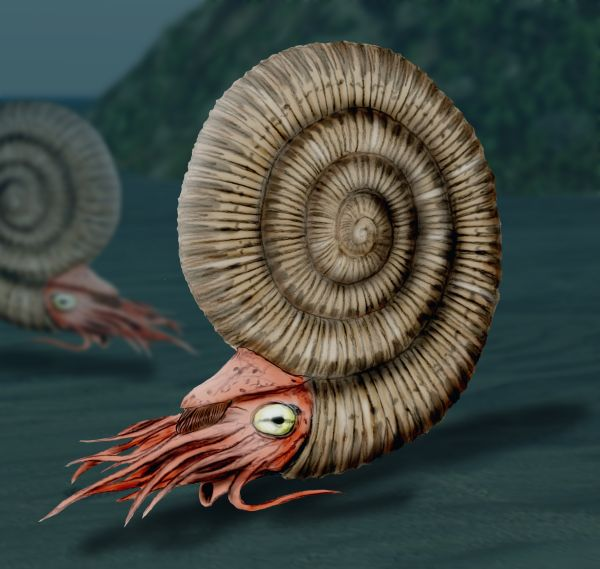
Reconstruction of an ammonite, a highly successful early cephalopod that appeared 400 mya.

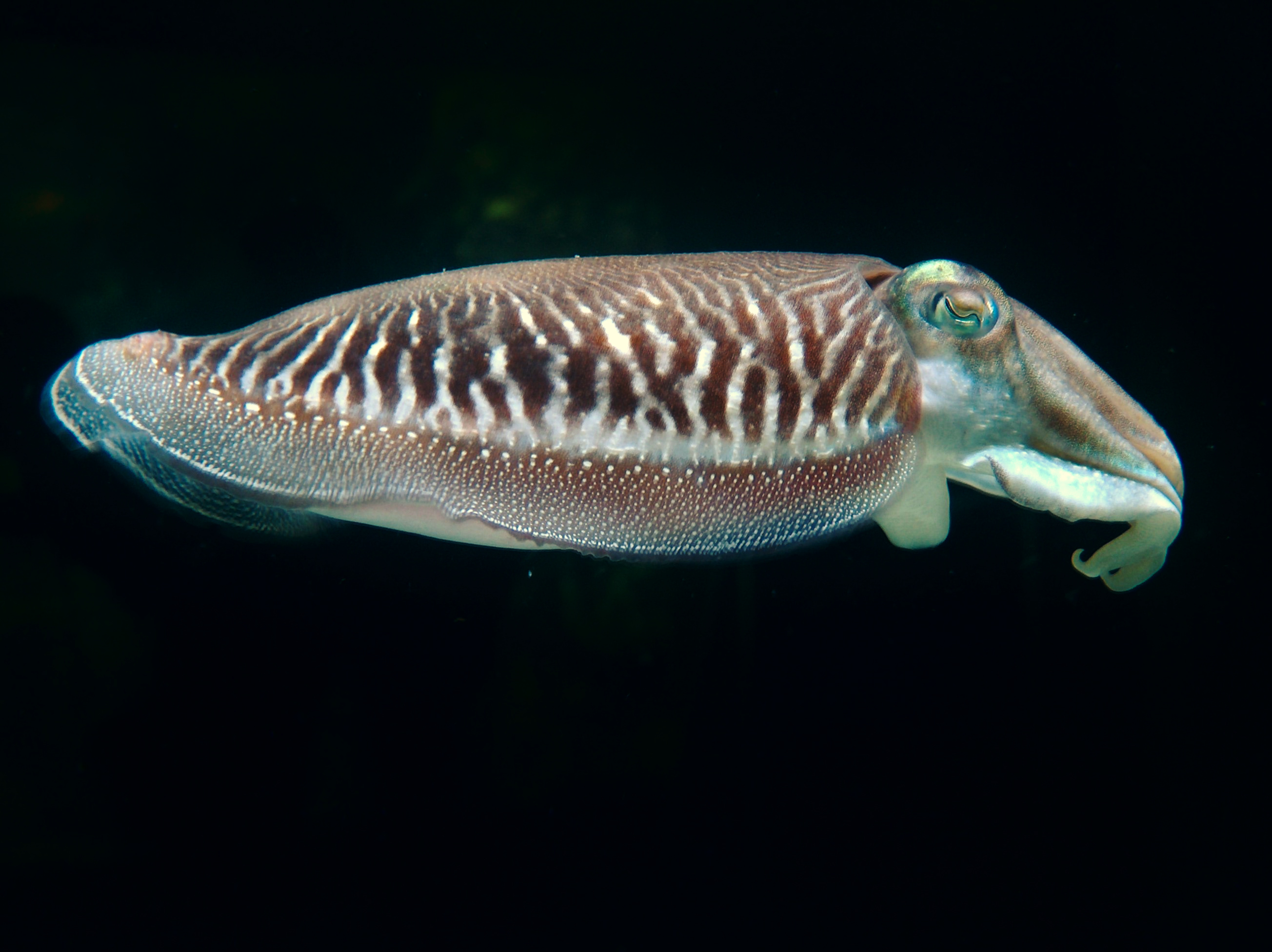
Cephalopods, like this cuttlefish, use their mantle cavity for jet propulsion.

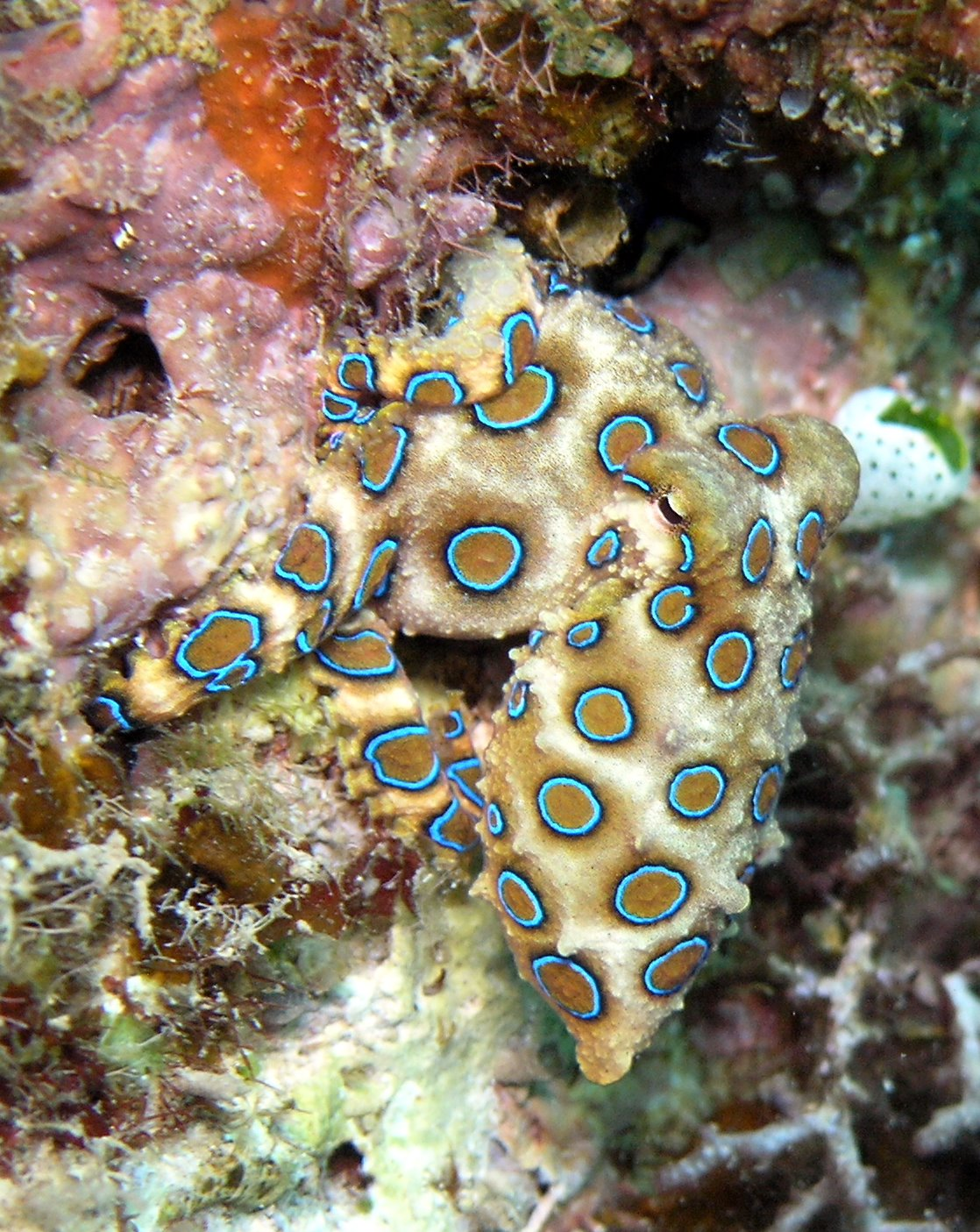
Warning display of greater blue-ringed octopus (Hapalochlaena lunulata)

Molluscs have such diverse shapes that many textbooks base their descriptions of molluscan anatomy on a generalized or hypothetical ancestral mollusc. This generalized mollusc is unsegmented and bilaterally symmetrical with an underside consisting of a single muscular foot. Beyond that it has three further key features. Firstly, it has a muscular cloak called a mantle covering its viscera and containing a significant cavity used for breathing and excretion. A shell secreted by the mantle covers the upper surface. Secondly (apart from bivalves) it has a rasping tongue called a radula used for feeding. Thirdly, it has a nervous system including a complex digestive system using microscopic, muscle-powered hairs called cilia to exude mucus. The generalized mollusc has two paired nerve cords (three in bivalves). The brain, in species that have one, encircles the esophagus. Most molluscs have eyes and all have sensors detecting chemicals, vibrations, and touch.

Good evidence exists for the appearance of marine gastropods, cephalopods and bivalves in the Cambrian period 538.8 to 486.85 million years ago.

==== Marine arthropods ====
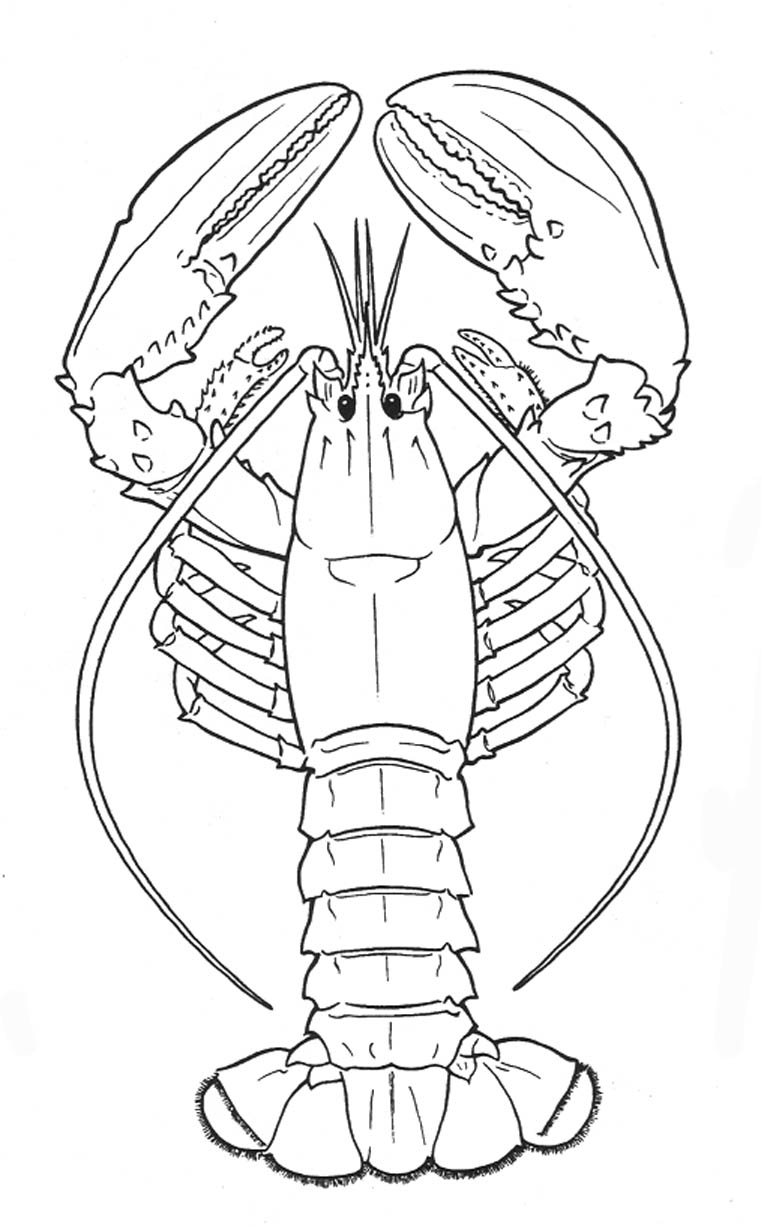
Segments and tagmata of an arthropod The thorax bears the main locomotory appendages. The head and thorax are fused in some arthropods, such as crabs and lobsters.

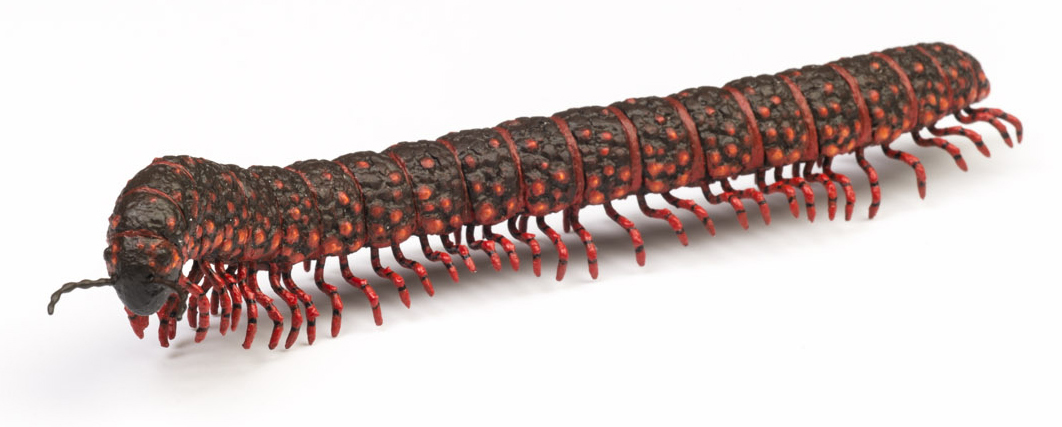
First known air-breathing animal to colonise land, the millipede Pneumodesmus newmani, lived in the Early Devonian.

Arthropods (Greek for jointed feet) have an exoskeleton (external skeleton), a segmented body, and jointed appendages (paired appendages). They form a phylum which includes insects, arachnids, myriapods, and crustaceans. Arthropods are characterized by their jointed limbs and cuticle made of chitin, often mineralized with calcium carbonate. The arthropod body plan consists of segments, each with a pair of appendages. The rigid cuticle inhibits growth, so arthropods replace it periodically by moulting. Their versatility has enabled them to become the most species-rich members of all ecological guilds in most environments.

The evolutionary ancestry of arthropods dates back to the Cambrian period and is generally regarded as monophyletic. However, basal relationships of arthropods with extinct phyla such as lobopodians have recently been debated.

- Panarthropoda
  - tardigrades water bears
  - Lobopodia
    - velvet worms (terrestrial)
    - arthropods mainly crustaceans

Arthropod fossils and living fossils

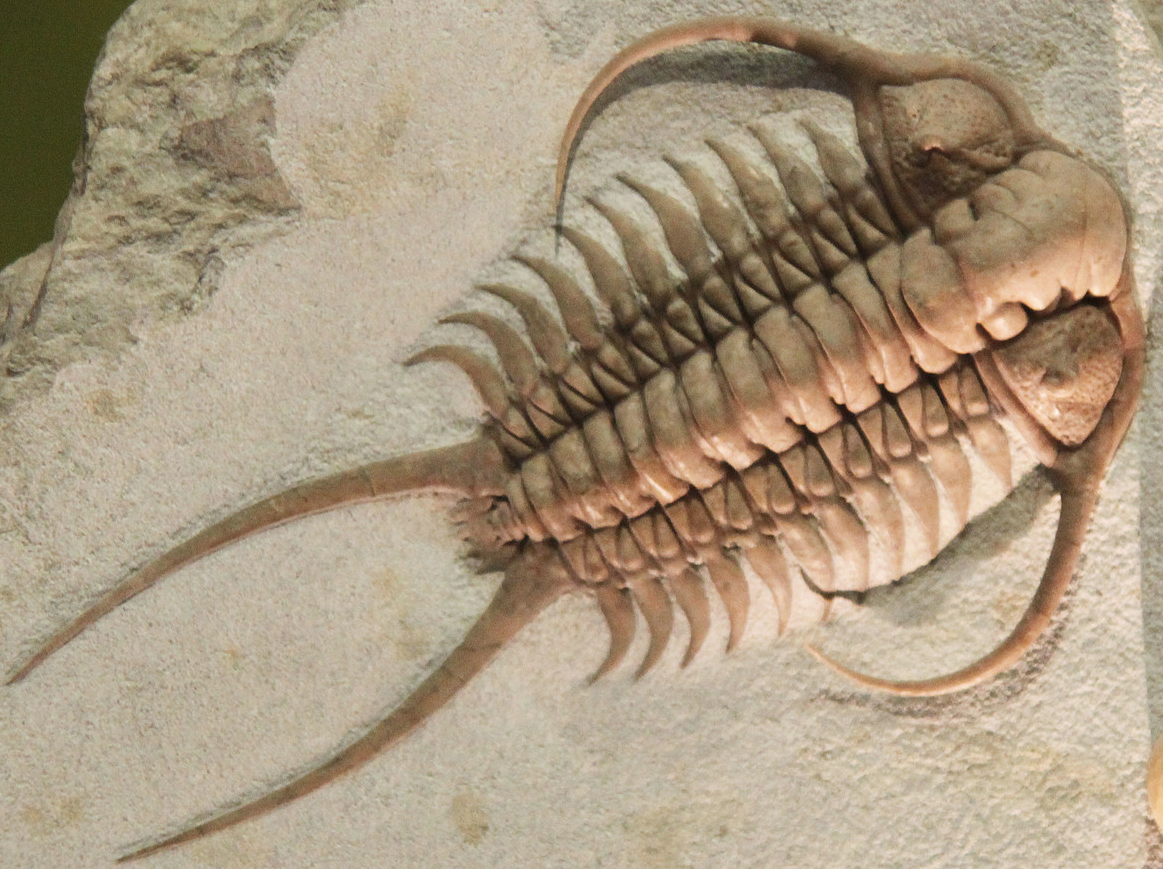
Fossil trilobite. Trilobites first appeared about 521 Ma. They were highly successful and were found everywhere in the ocean for 270 Ma.

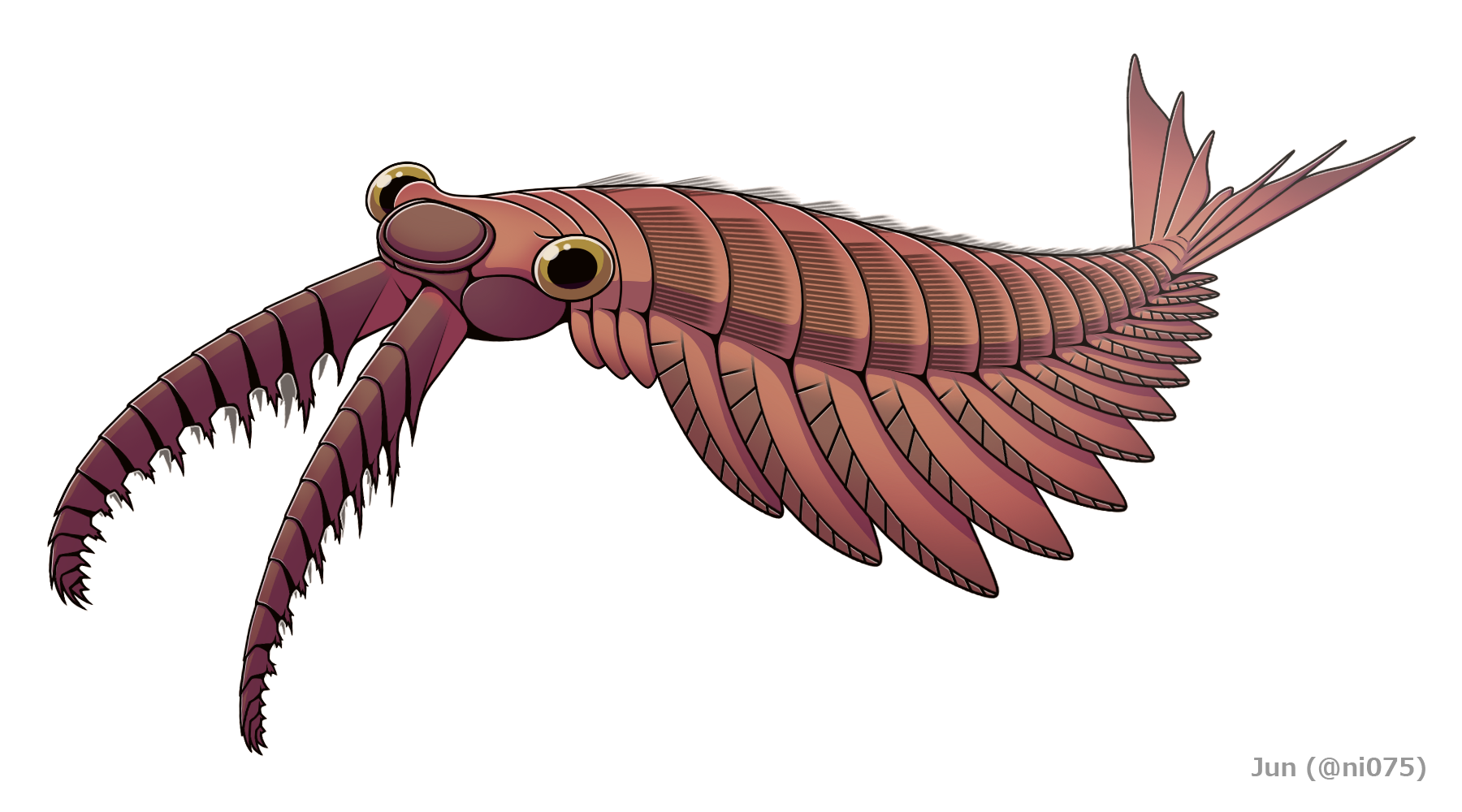
The Anomalocaris ("abnormal shrimp") was one of the first apex predators and first appeared about 515 Ma.

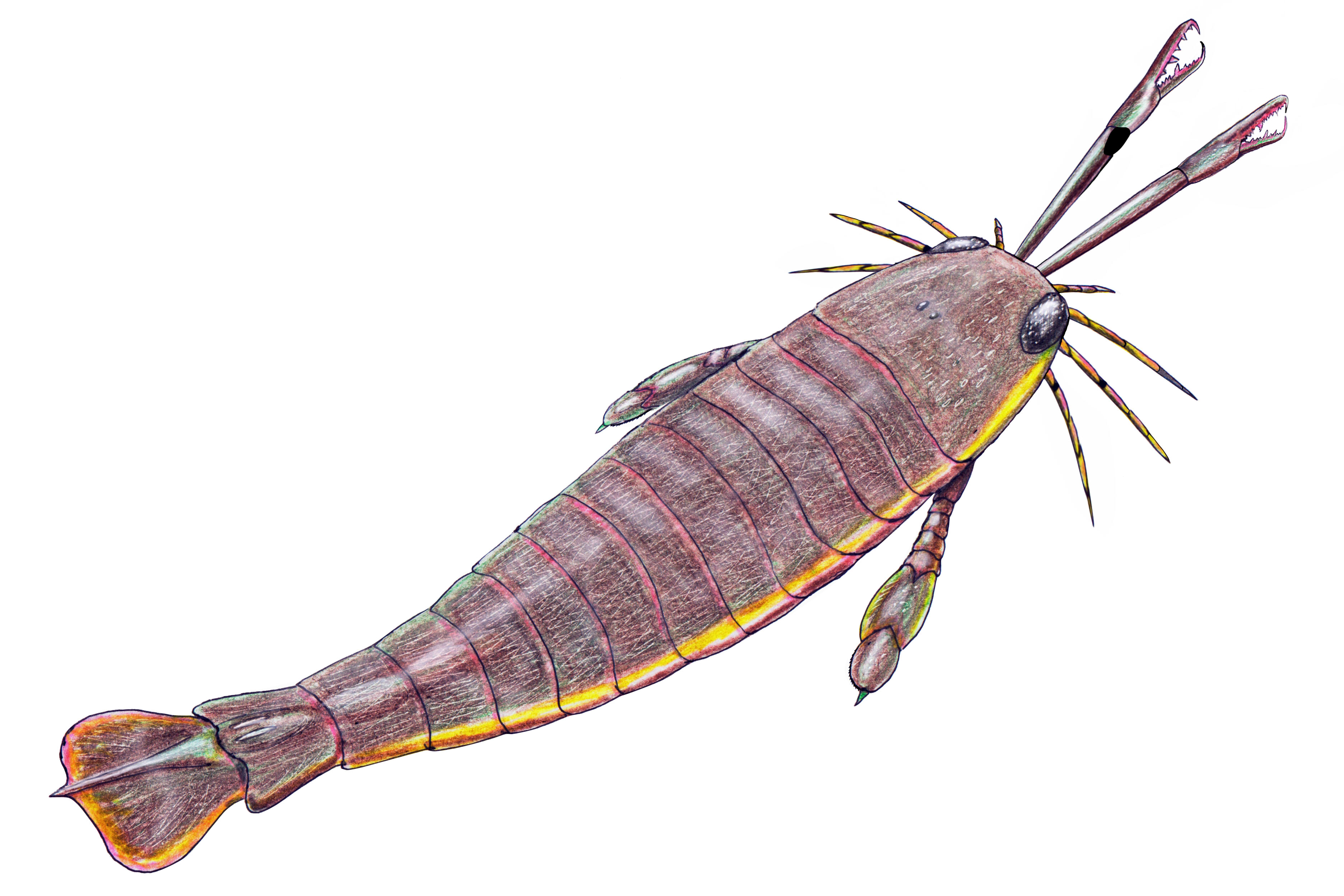
The largest known arthropod, the sea scorpion Jaekelopterus rhenaniae, has been found in estuarine strata from about 390 Ma. It was up to 2.5 m (8.2 ft) long.

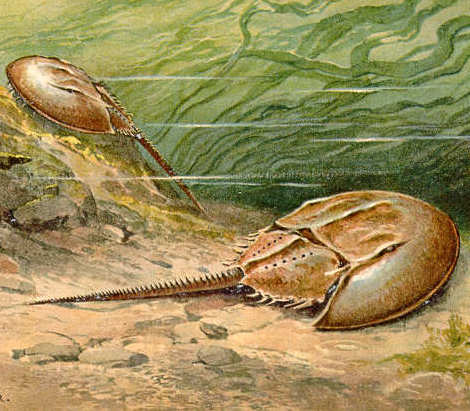
Xiphosurans, the group including modern Horseshoe crabs appeared around 480 Ma.

Extant marine arthropods range in size from the microscopic crustacean Stygotantulus to the Japanese spider crab. Arthropods' primary internal cavity is a hemocoel, which accommodates their internal organs, and through which their haemolymph - analogue of blood - circulates; they have open circulatory systems. Like their exteriors, the internal organs of arthropods are generally built of repeated segments. Their nervous system is "ladder-like", with paired ventral nerve cords running through all segments and forming paired ganglia in each segment. Their heads are formed by fusion of varying numbers of segments, and their brains are formed by fusion of the ganglia of these segments and encircle the esophagus. The respiratory and excretory systems of arthropods vary, depending as much on their environment as on the subphylum to which they belong.

Modern crustaceans

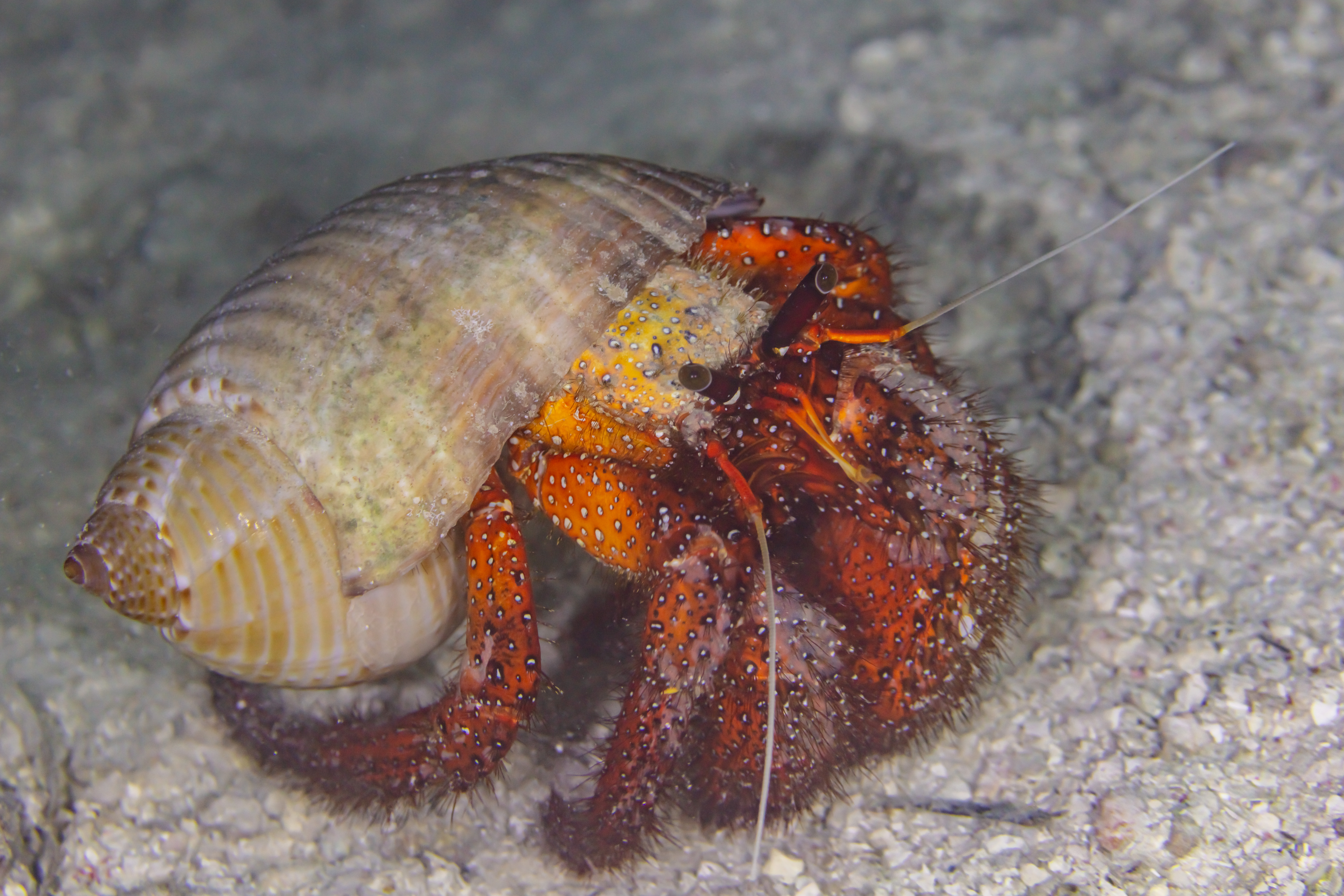
Hermit crabs use abandoned gastropod shells to protect their fragile abdomens.

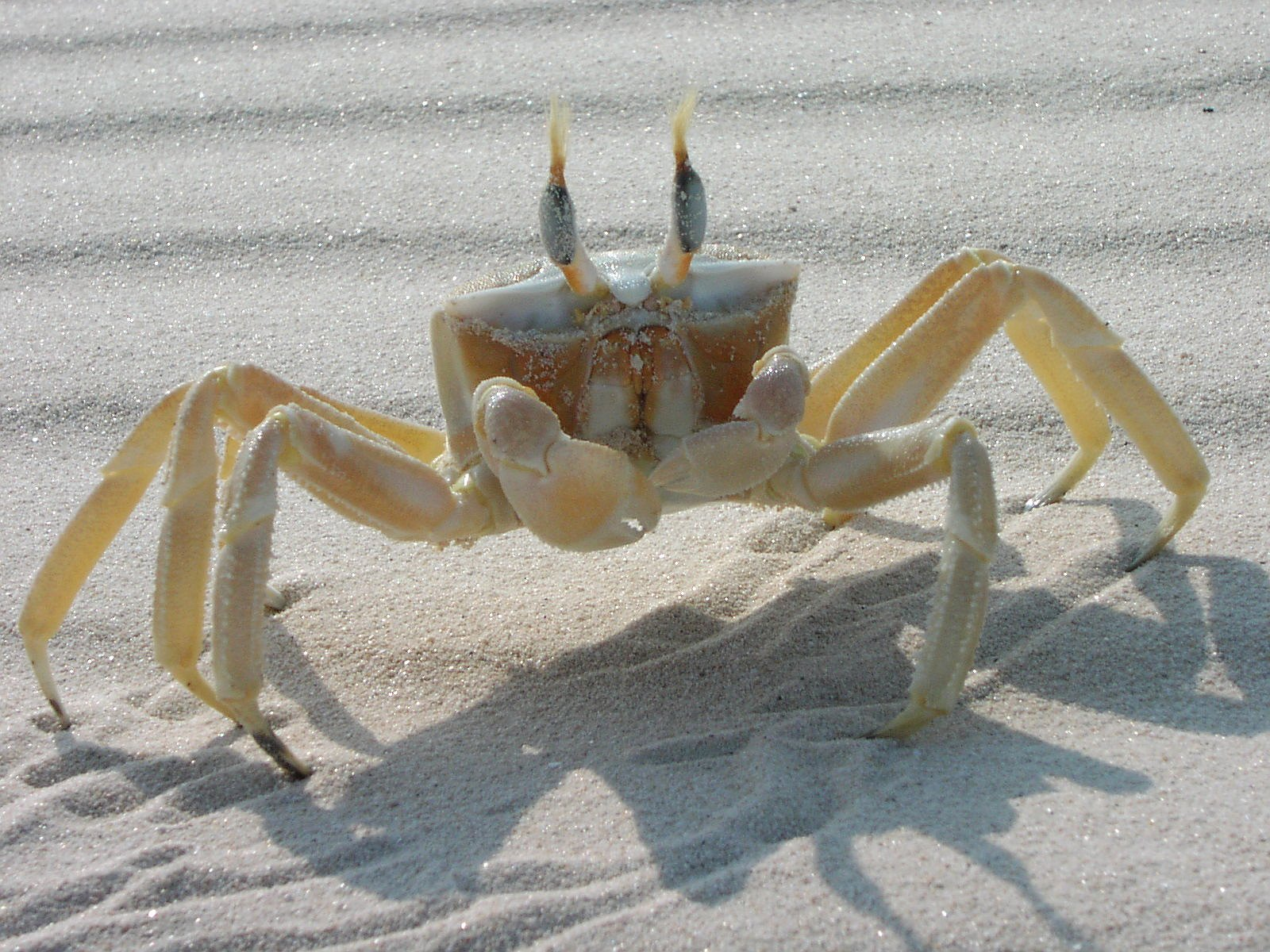
Tufted ghost crab, Ocypode cursor, lives on sandy beaches.

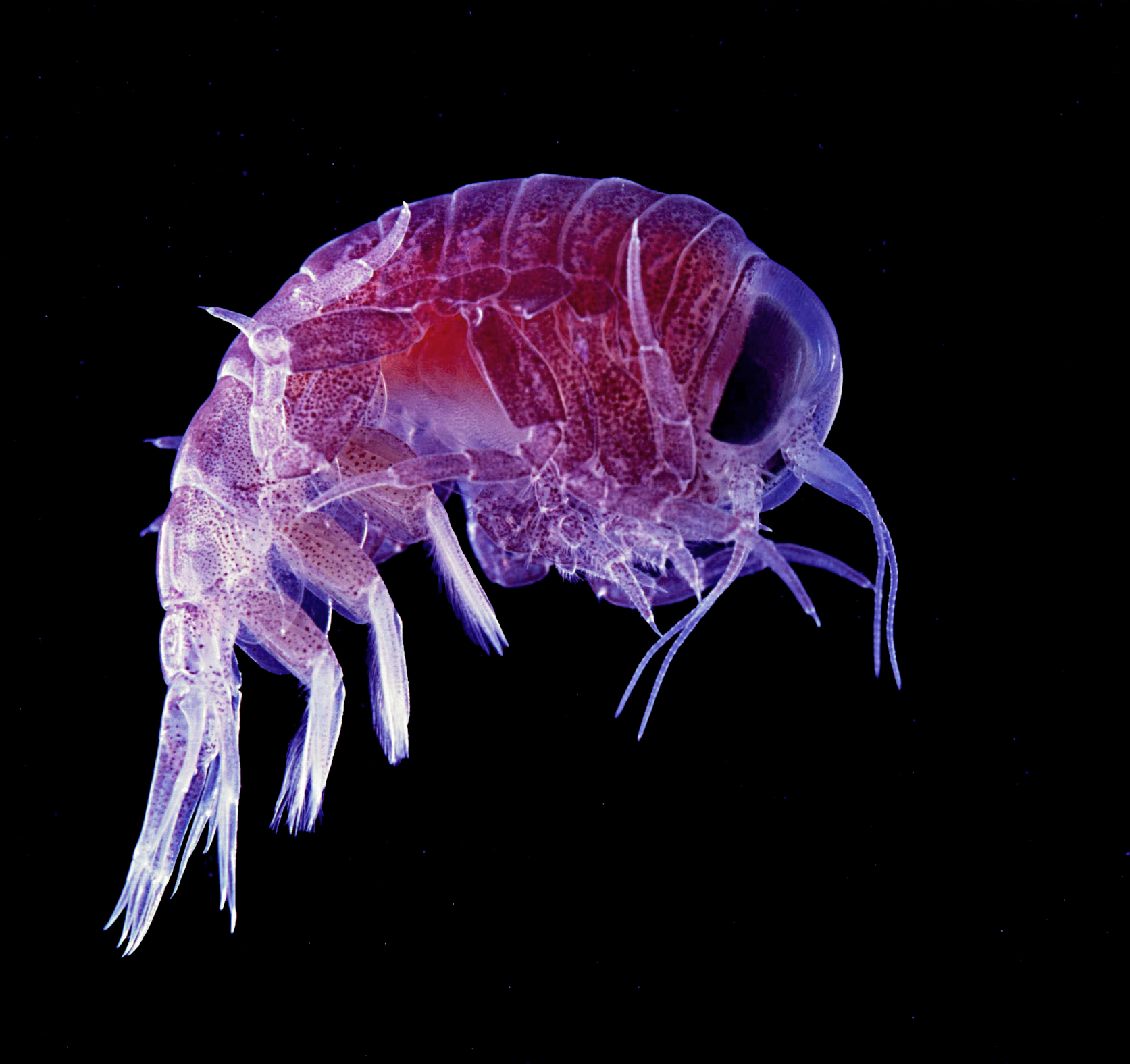
Many crustaceans are very small, like this tiny amphipod, and make up a significant part of the ocean's zooplankton.

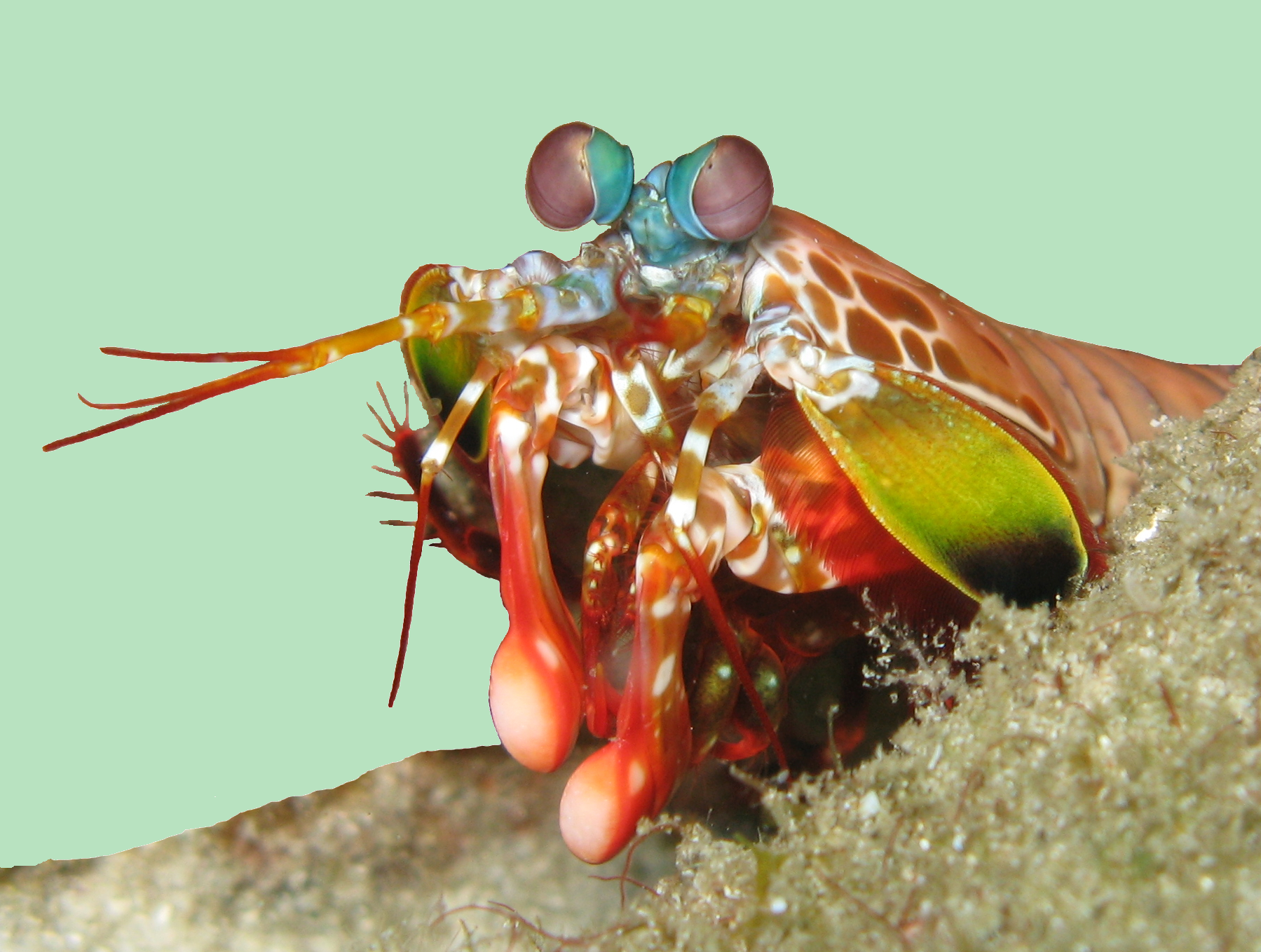
Mantis shrimp have the most advanced eyes in the animal kingdom, and smash prey by swinging their club-like raptorial claws.

Arthropod vision relies on various combinations of compound eyes and pigment-pit ocelli: in most species the ocelli can only detect the direction from which light is coming, and the compound eyes are the main source of information. Arthropods also have a wide range of chemical and mechanical sensors, mostly based on modifications of the many setae (bristles) that project through their cuticles. Arthropod methods of reproduction are diverse: terrestrial species use some form of internal fertilization while marine species lay eggs using either internal or external fertilization. Arthropod hatchlings vary from miniature adults to grubs that lack jointed limbs and eventually undergo a total metamorphosis to produce the adult form.

=== Deuterostomes ===
In deuterostomes the first opening that develops in the growing embryo becomes the anus, while in protostomes it becomes the mouth. Deuterostomes form a superphylum of animals and are the sister clade of the protostomes. It is once considered that the earliest known deuterostomes are Saccorhytus fossils from about 540 million years ago. However, another study considered that Saccorhytus is more likely to be an ecdysozoan.

- deuterostomes (extant)
  - ambulacrarians
    - echinoderms
    - hemichordates
  - chordates
    - cephalochordates
    - - tunicates
      - vertebrates →

==== Echinoderms ====
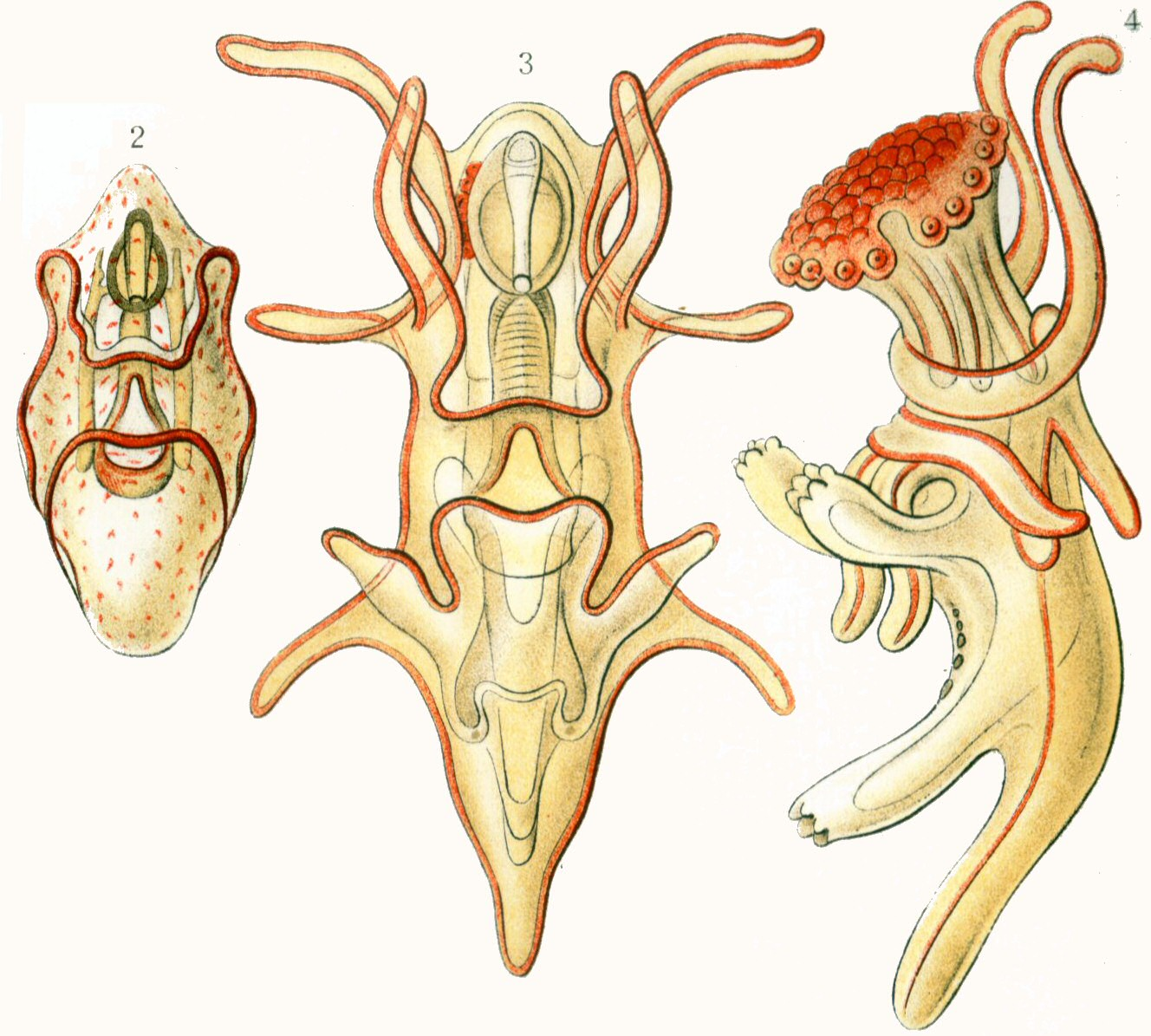
Adult echinoderms have fivefold symmetry but as larvae have bilateral symmetry. This is why they are in the Bilateria.

Echinoderms (Greek for spiny skin) is a phylum which contains only marine invertebrates. The phylum contains about 7000 living species, making it the second-largest grouping of deuterostomes, after the chordates.

Adult echinoderms are recognizable by their radial symmetry (usually five-point) and include starfish, sea urchins, sand dollars, and sea cucumbers, as well as the sea lilies. Echinoderms are found at every ocean depth, from the intertidal zone to the abyssal zone. They are unique among animals in having bilateral symmetry at the larval stage, but five-fold symmetry (pentamerism, a special type of radial symmetry) as adults.

Echinoderms are important both biologically and geologically. Biologically, there are few other groupings so abundant in the biotic desert of the deep sea, as well as shallower oceans. Most echinoderms are able to regenerate tissue, organs, limbs, and reproduce asexually; in some cases, they can undergo complete regeneration from a single limb. Geologically, the value of echinoderms is in their ossified skeletons, which are major contributors to many limestone formations, and can provide valuable clues as to the geological environment. They were the most used species in regenerative research in the 19th and 20th centuries.

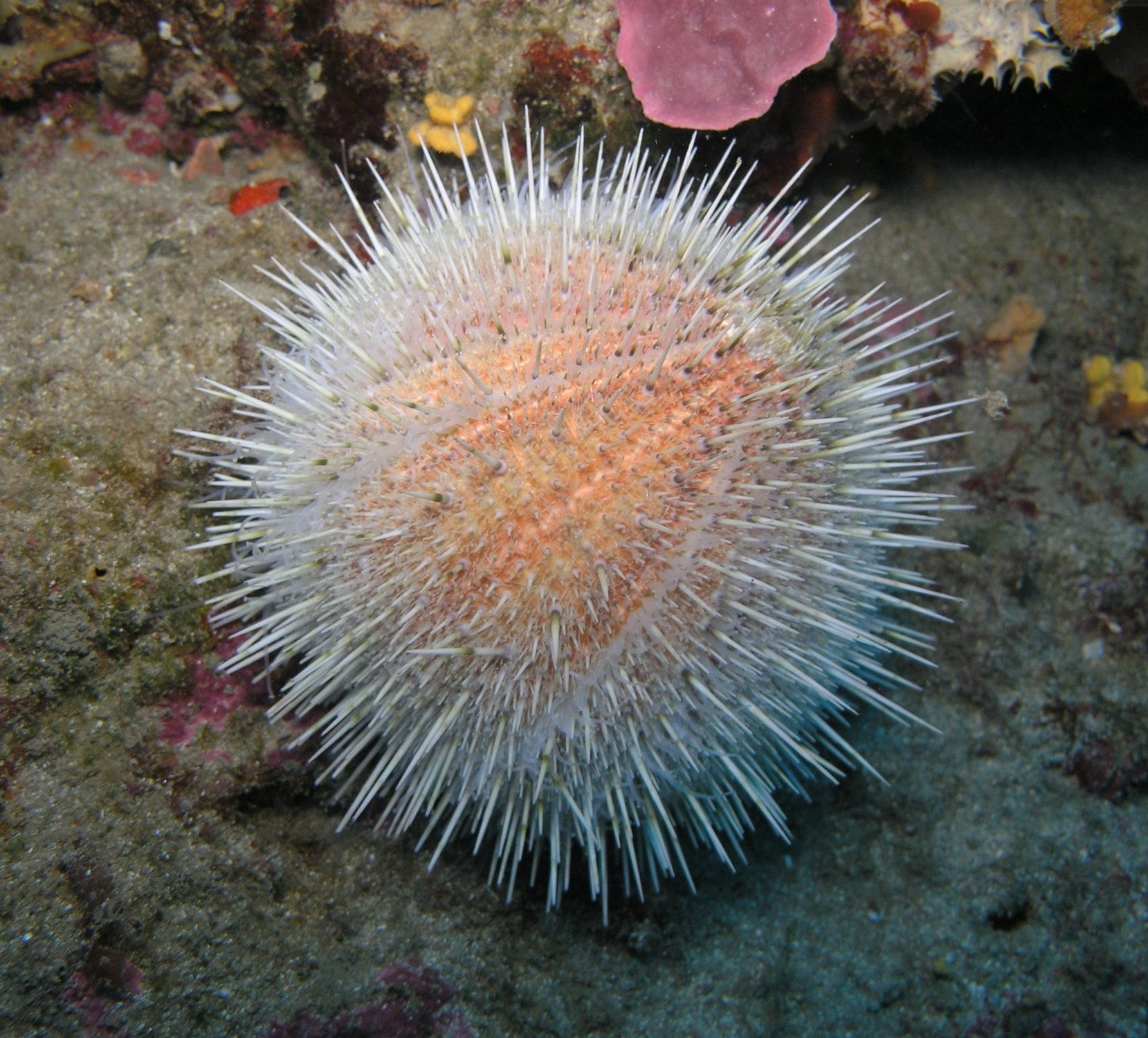
Echinoderm literally means "spiny skin", as this water melon sea urchin illustrates.

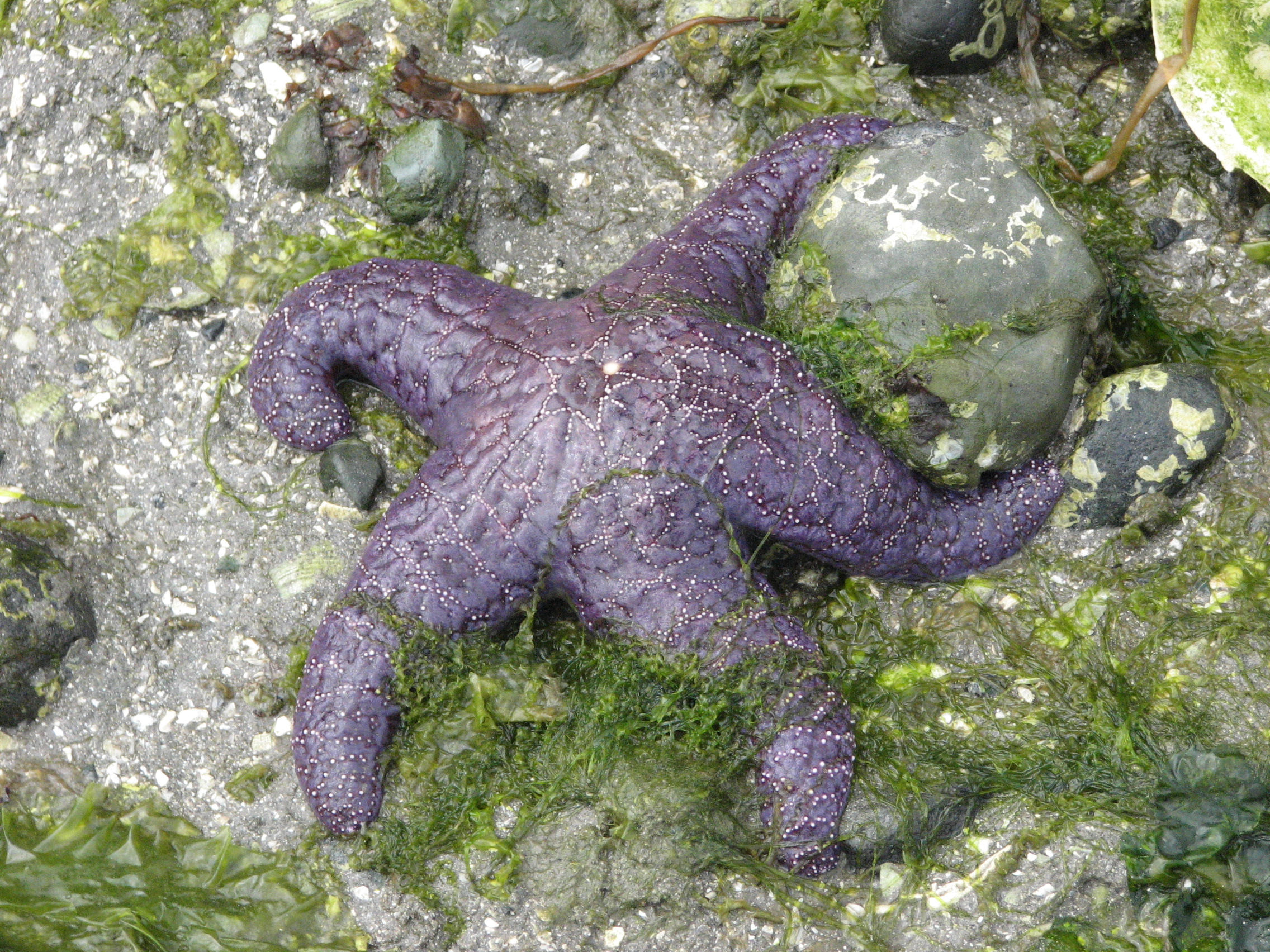
The ochre sea star was the first keystone predator to be studied. They limit mussels which can overwhelm intertidal communities.

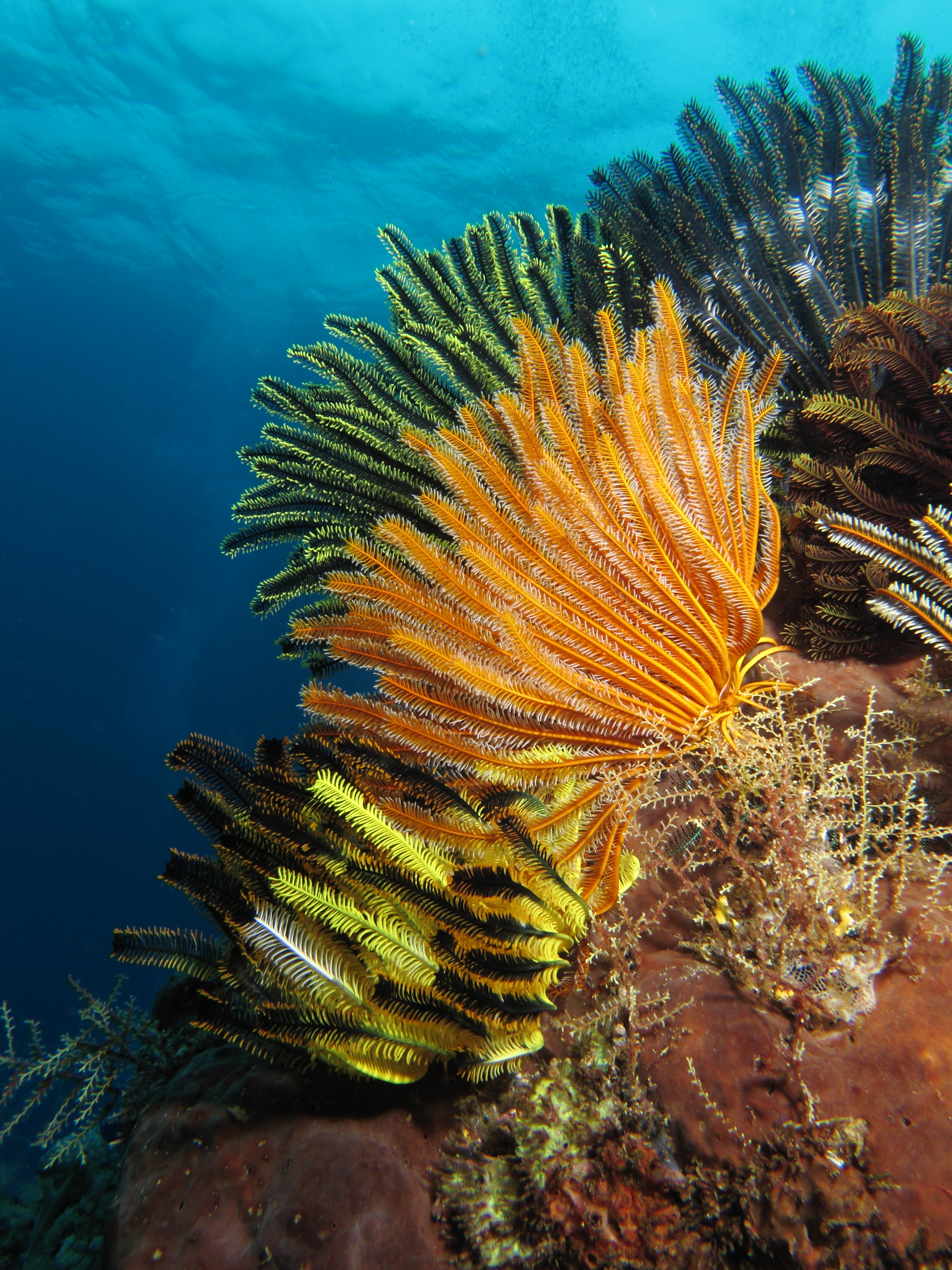
Colorful sea lilies in shallow waters
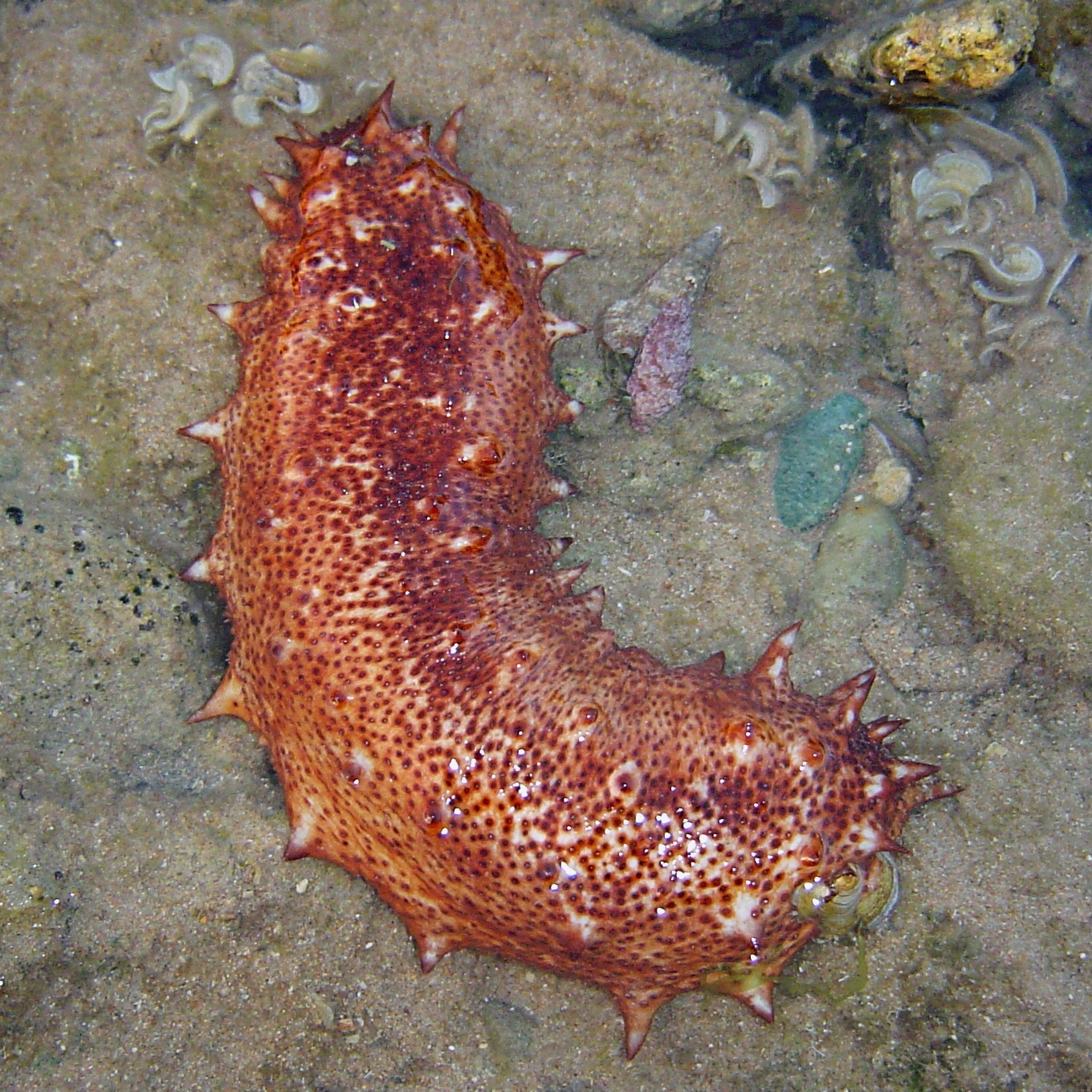
Sea cucumbers filter feed on plankton and suspended solids.

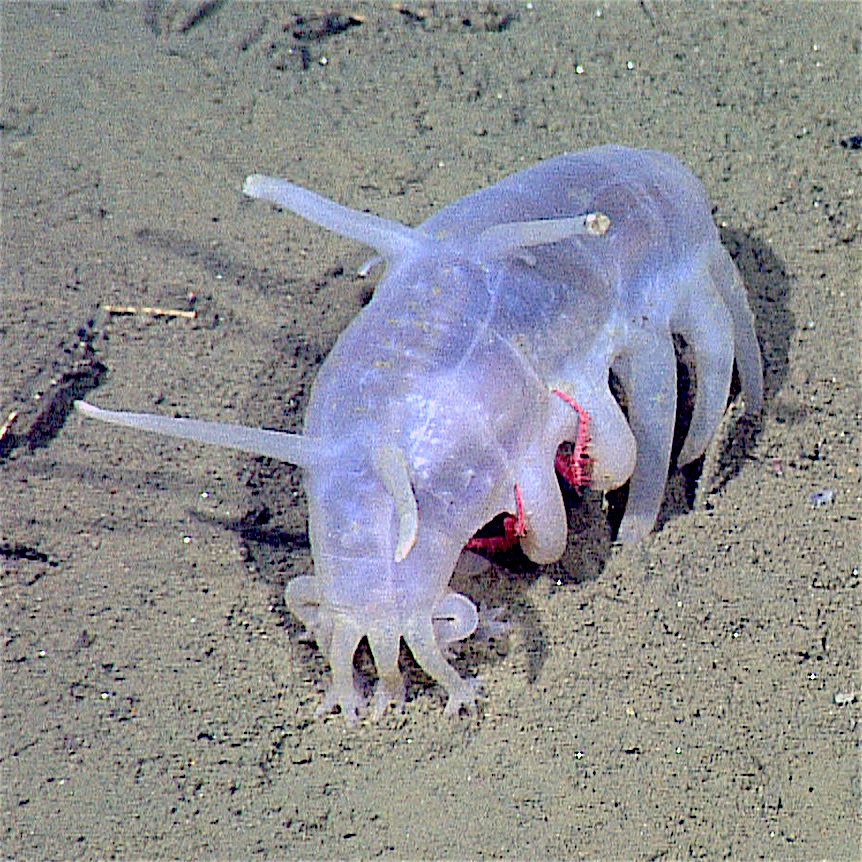
The sea pig, a deep water sea cucumber, is the only echinoderm that uses legged locomotion.

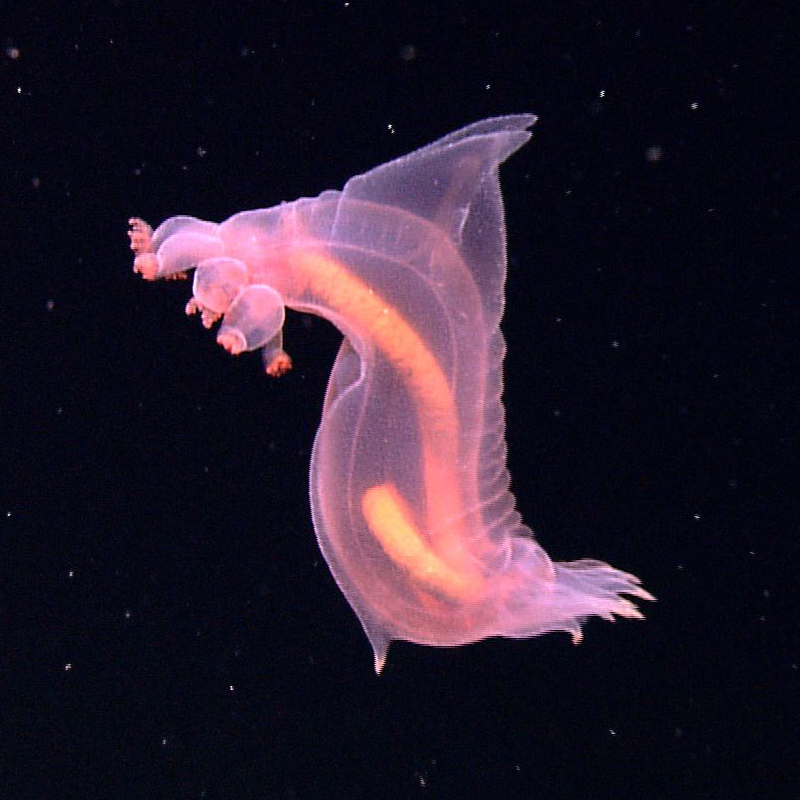
A benthopelagic and bioluminescent swimming sea cucumber, 3200 meters deep

It is held by some scientists that the radiation of echinoderms was responsible for the Mesozoic Marine Revolution. Aside from the hard-to-classify Arkarua (a Precambrian animal with echinoderm-like pentamerous radial symmetry), the first definitive members of the phylum appeared near the start of the Cambrian.

==== Hemichordates ====
Gill (pharyngeal) slits

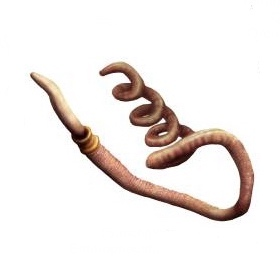
The acorn worm is associated with the development of gill slits.

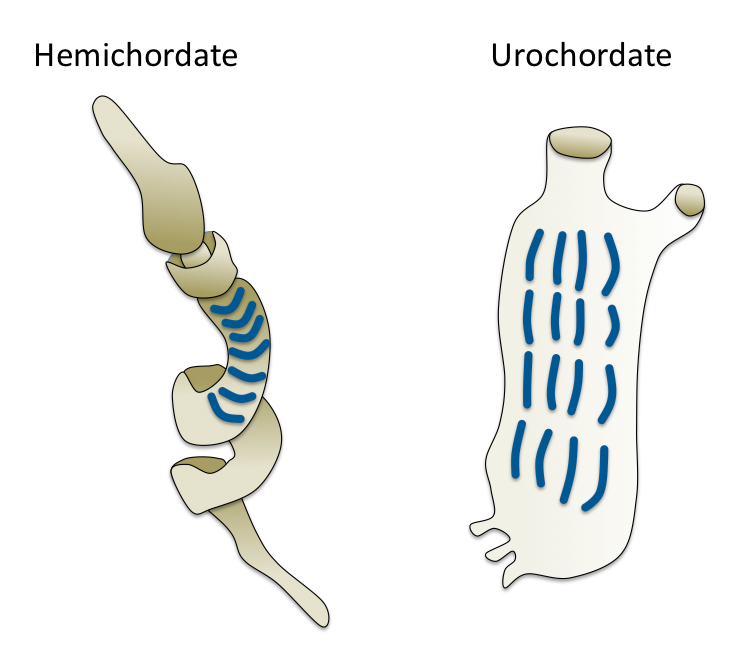
Gill slits in an acorn worm (left) and tunicate (right)

Gill slits have been described as "the foremost morphological innovation of early deuterostomes". In aquatic organisms, gill slits allow water that enters the mouth during feeding to exit. Some invertebrate chordates also use the slits to filter food from the water.

Hemichordates form a sister phylum to the echinoderms. They are solitary worm-shaped organisms rarely seen by humans because of their lifestyle. They include two main groups, the acorn worms and the Pterobranchia. Pterobranchia form a class containing about 30 species of small worm-shaped animals that live in secreted tubes on the ocean floor. Acorn worms form a class containing about 111 species that generally live in U-shaped burrows on the seabed, from the shoreline to a depth of 3000 meters. The worms lie there with the proboscis sticking out of one opening in the burrow, subsisting as deposit feeders or suspension feeders. It is supposed the ancestors of acorn worms used to live in tubes like their relatives, the Pterobranchia, but eventually started to live a safer and more sheltered existence in sediment burrows. Some of these worms may grow to be very long; one particular species may reach a length of 2.5 meters (8 feet 2 inches), although most acorn worms are much smaller.

Acorn worms are more highly specialized and advanced than other worm-like organisms. They have a circulatory system with a heart that also functions as a kidney. Acorn worms have gill-like structures they use for breathing, similar to the gills of fish. Therefore, acorn worms are sometimes said to be a link between classical invertebrates and vertebrates. Acorn worms continually form new gill slits as they grow in size, and some older individuals have more than a hundred on each side. Each slit consists of a branchial chamber opening to the pharynx through a U-shaped cleft. Cilia push water through the slits, maintaining a constant flow, just as in fish. Some acorn worms also have a postanal tail which may be homologous to the post-anal tail of vertebrates.

The three-section body plan of the acorn worm is no longer present in the vertebrates, except in the anatomy of the frontal neural tube, later developed into a brain divided into three parts. This means some of the original anatomy of the early chordate ancestors is still present in vertebrates even if it is not always visible. One theory is the three-part body originated from an early common ancestor of the deuterostomes, and maybe even from a common bilateral ancestor of both deuterostomes and protostomes. Studies have shown the gene expression in the embryo share three of the same signaling centers that shape the brains of all vertebrates, but instead of taking part in the formation of their neural system, they are controlling the development of the different body regions.

==== Marine chordates ====
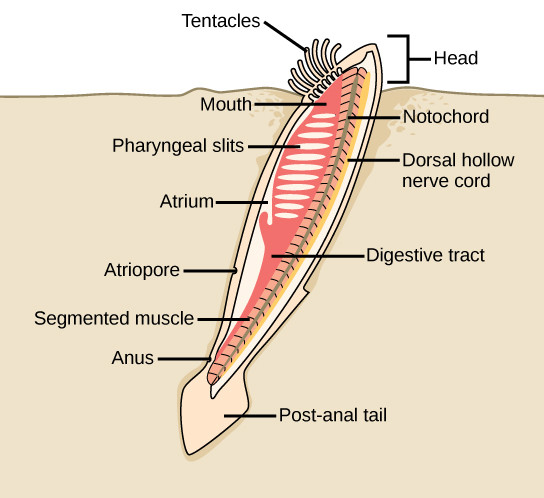
The lancelet, like all cephalochordates, has a head. Adult lancelets retain the four key features of chordates: a notochord, a dorsal hollow nerve cord, pharyngeal slits, and a post-anal tail. Water from the mouth enters the pharyngeal slits, which filter out food particles. The filtered water then collects in the atrium and exits through the atriopore.

The chordate phylum has three subphyla, one of which is the vertebrates (see below). The other two subphyla are marine invertebrates: the tunicates (salps and sea squirts) and the cephalochordates (such as lancelets). Invertebrate chordates are close relatives to vertebrates. In particular, there has been discussion about how closely some extinct marine species, such as Pikaiidae, Palaeospondylus, Zhongxiniscus and Vetulicolia, might relate ancestrally to vertebrates.

Invertebrate chordates are close relatives of vertebrates

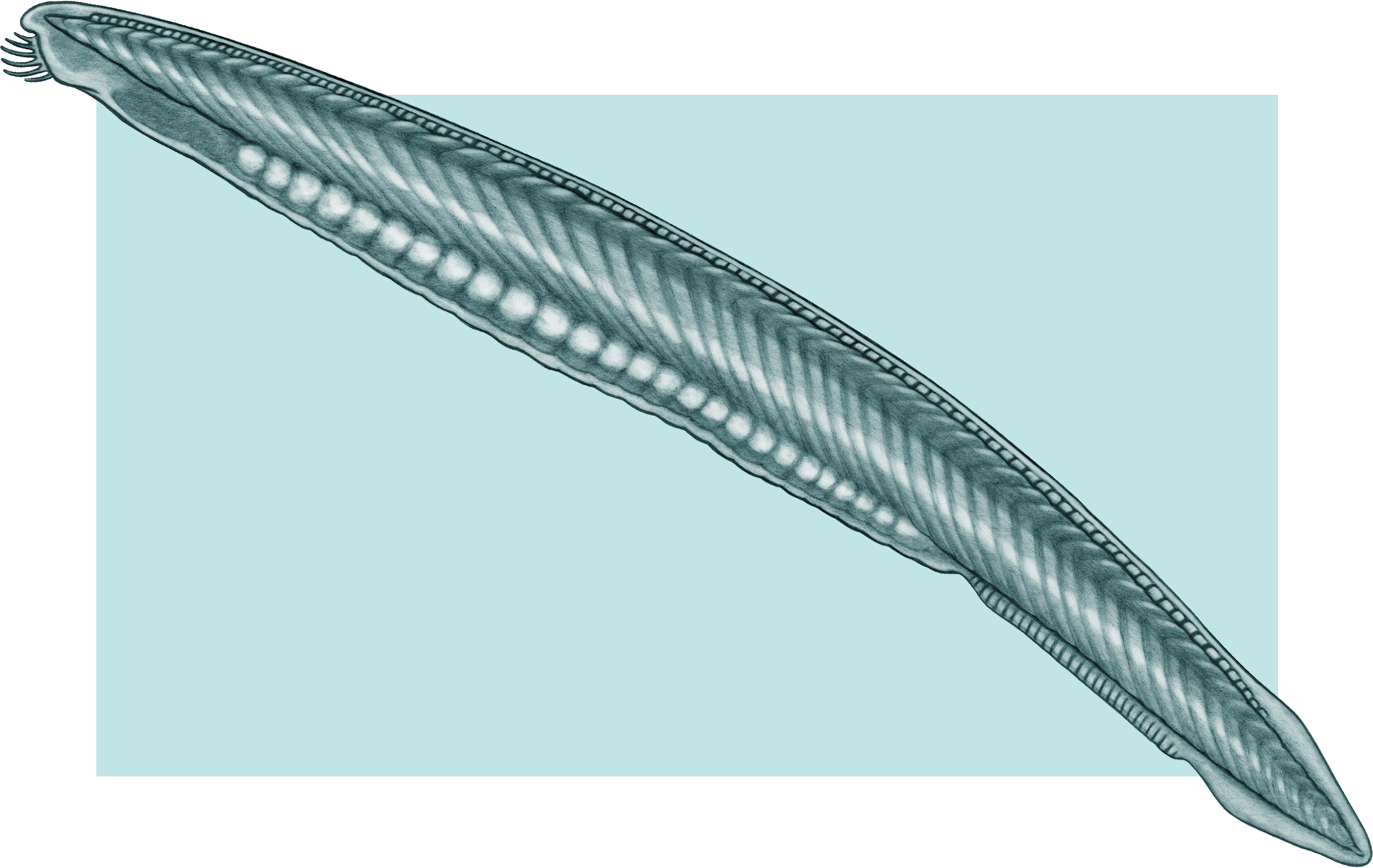
The lancelet, a small translucent fish-like cephalochordate, is one of the closest living invertebrate relative of the vertebrates.

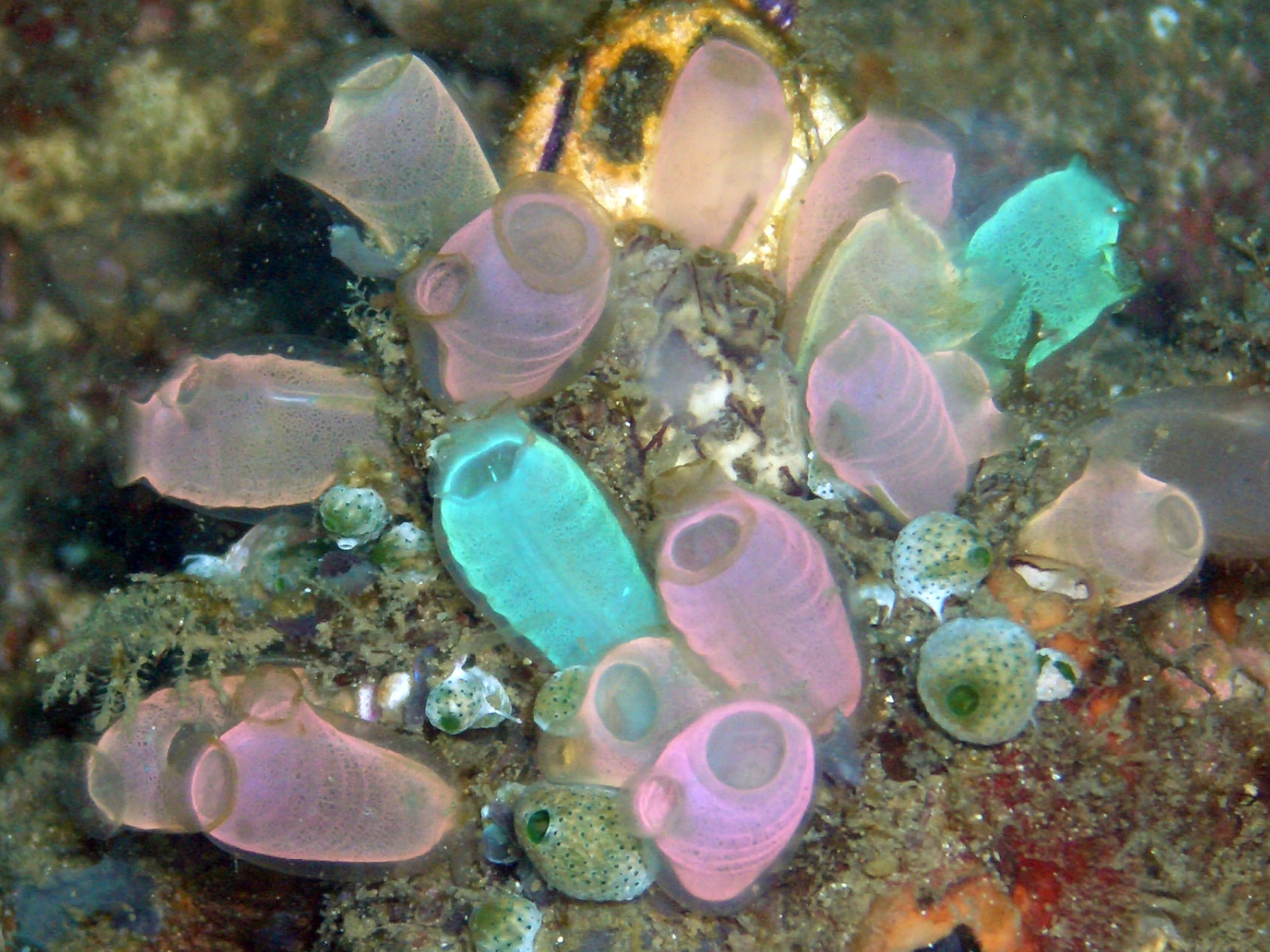
Tunicates, like these fluorescent-colored sea squirts, may provide clues to vertebrate and therefore human ancestry.

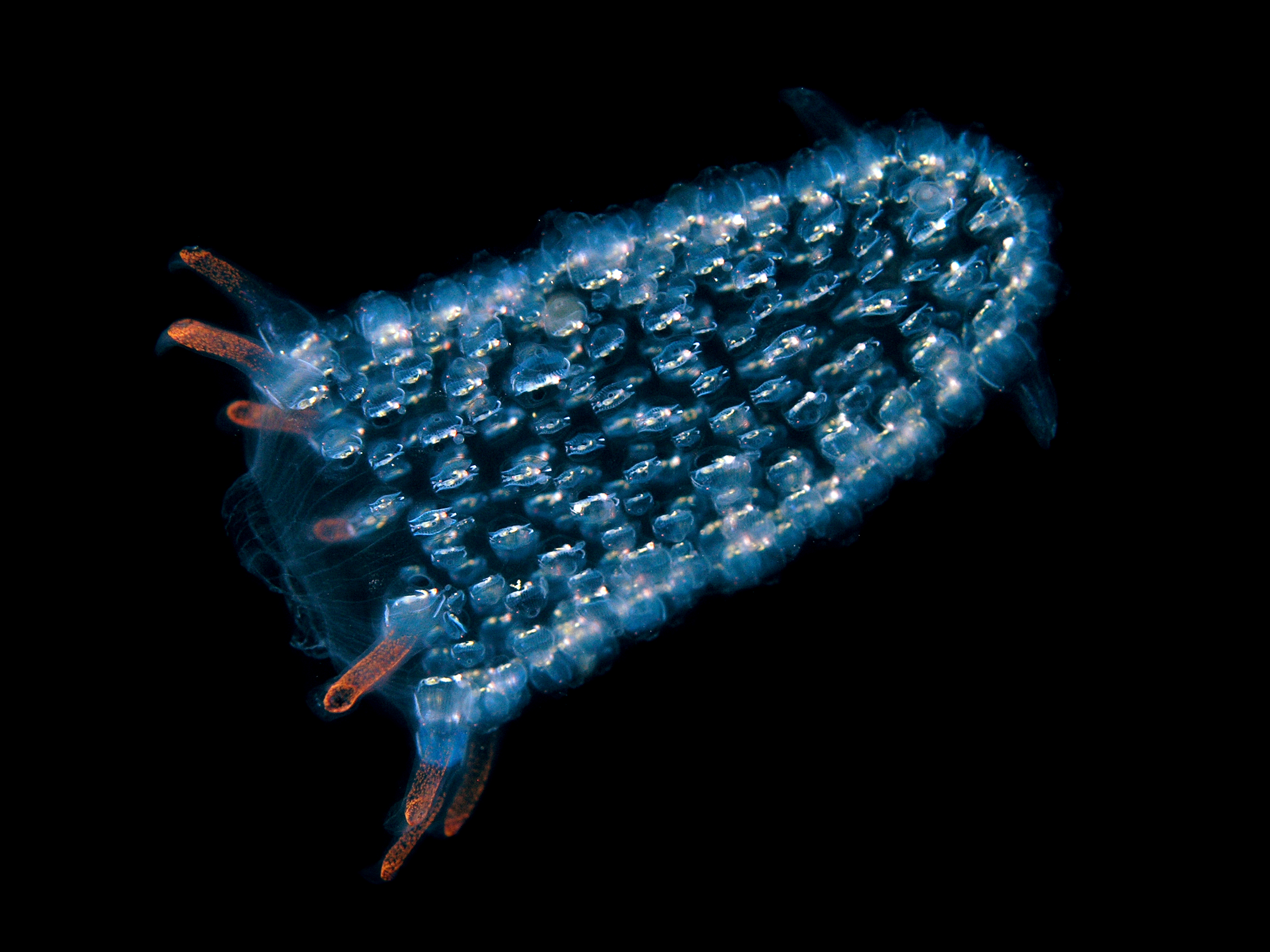
Pyrosomes are free-floating bioluminescent tunicates made up of hundreds of individuals.

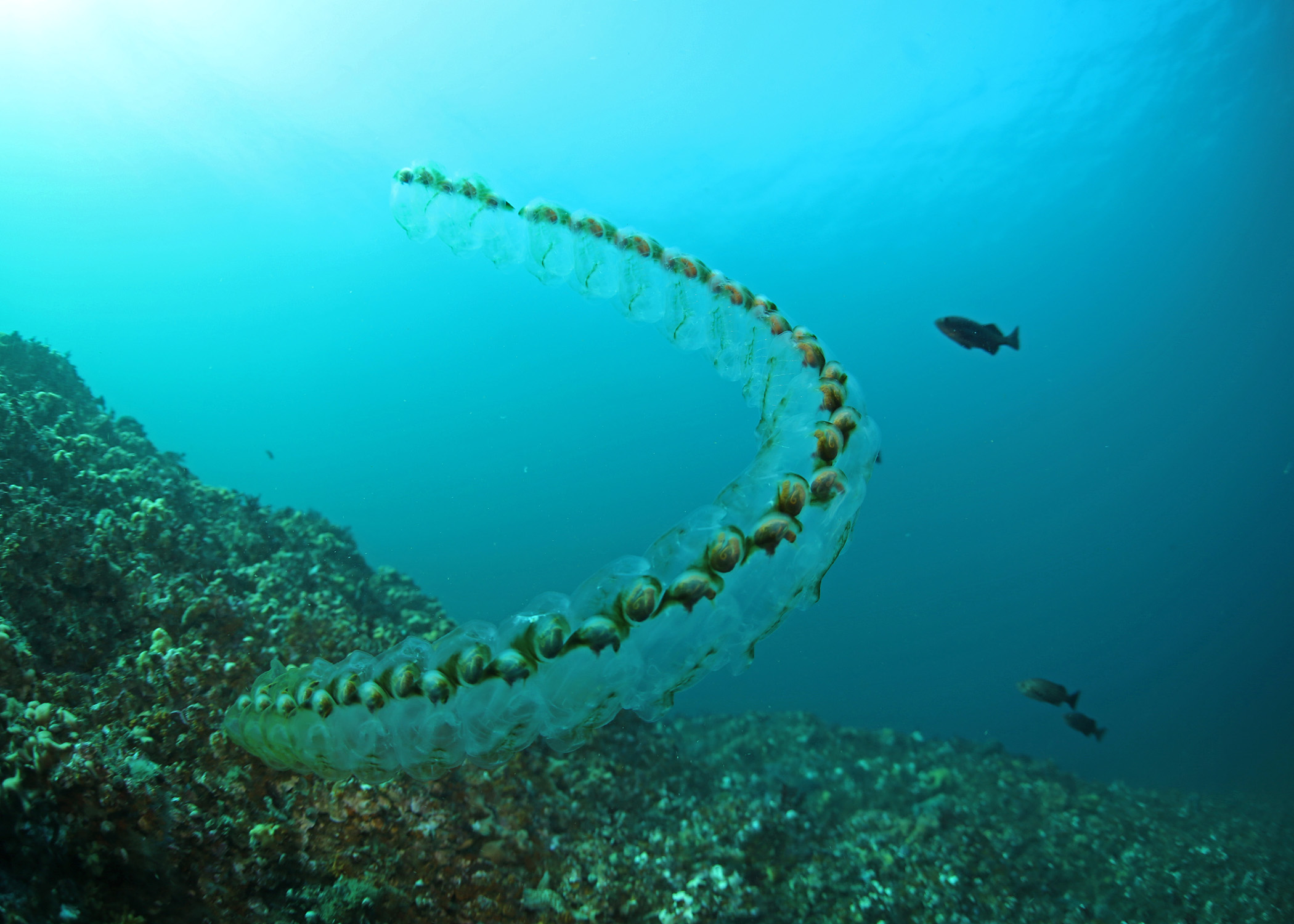
Salp chain

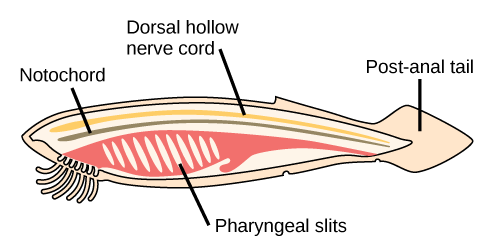
In chordates, the four above labelled common features appear at some point during development.

== Vertebrate animals ==
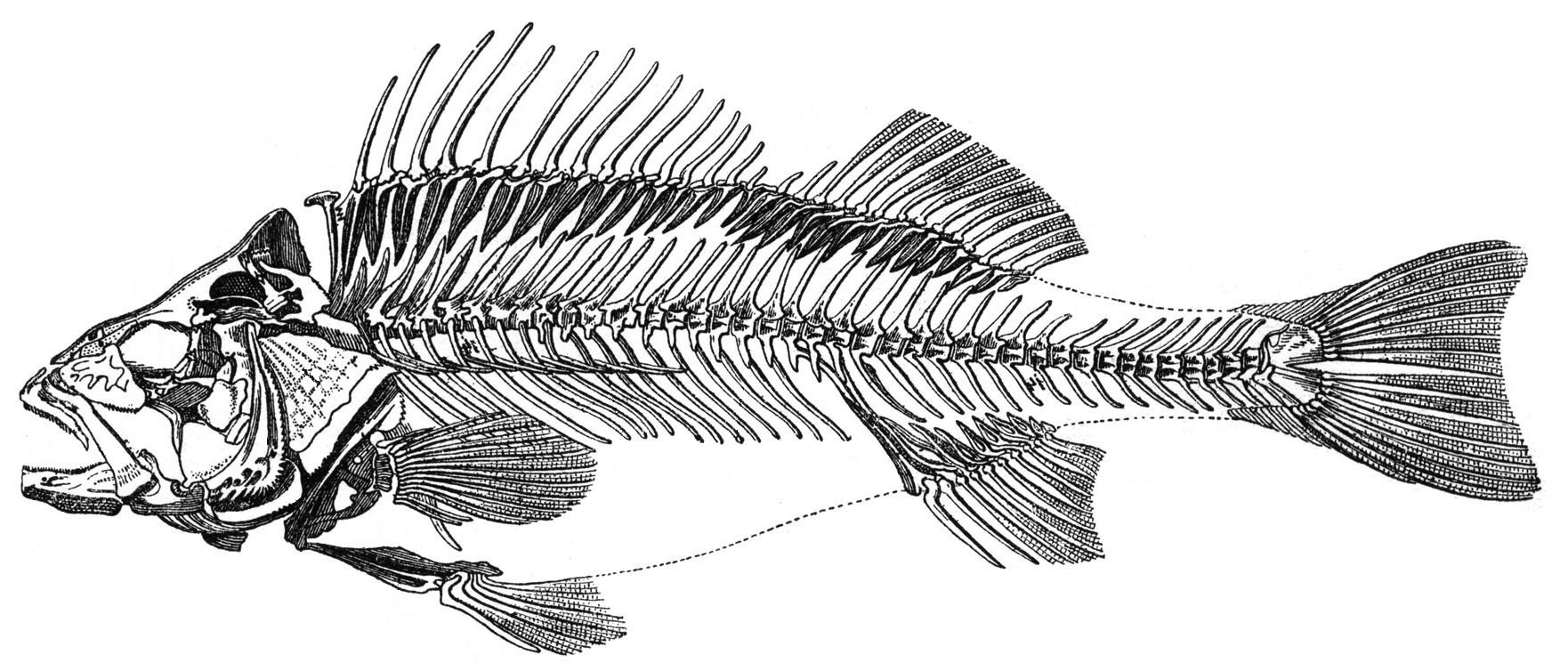
Ray-finned fish

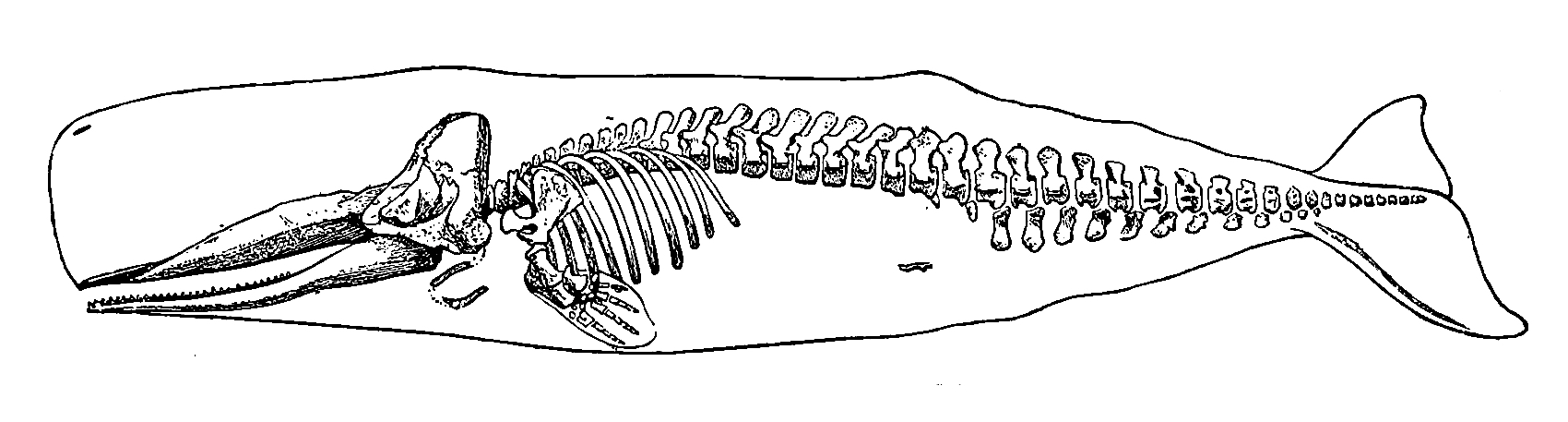
Marine tetrapod (sperm whale)

Skeletal structures showing the vertebral column and internal skeleton running from the head to the tail.

Vertebrates (Latin for joints of the spine) are a subphylum of chordates. They are chordates that have a vertebral column (backbone). The vertebral column provides the central support structure for an internal skeleton which gives shape, support, and protection to the body and can provide a means of anchoring fins or limbs to the body. The vertebral column also serves to house and protect the spinal cord that lies within the vertebral column.

Marine vertebrates can be divided into marine fish and marine tetrapods.

=== Marine fish ===
Fish typically breathe by extracting oxygen from water through gills and have a skin protected by scales and mucous. They use fins to propel and stabilise themselves in the water, and usually have a two-chambered heart and eyes well adapted to seeing underwater, as well as other sensory systems. Over 33,000 species of fish have been described as of 2017, of which about 20,000 are marine fish.

- ← vertebrates (extant)
  - jawless fish
    - hagfish
    - - lampreys
  - jawed fish
    - - cartilaginous fish
    - - bony fish →

==== Jawless fish ====
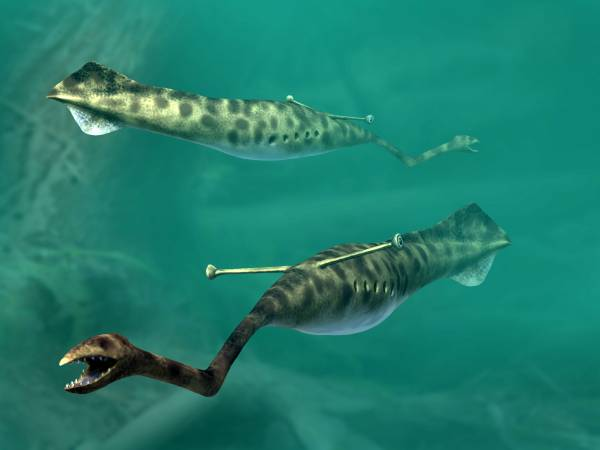
The Tully monster, a strange looking extinct animal with eyes like a hammerhead protruding from its back, may be an early jawless fish.

Early fish had no jaws. Most went extinct when they were outcompeted by jawed fish (below), but two groups survived: hagfish and lampreys. Hagfish form a class of about 20 species of eel-shaped, slime-producing marine fish. They are the only known living animals that have a skull but no vertebral column. Lampreys form a superclass containing 38 known extant species of jawless fish. The adult lamprey is characterized by a toothed, funnel-like sucking mouth. Although they are well known for boring into the flesh of other fish to suck their blood, only 18 species of lampreys are actually parasitic. Together hagfish and lampreys are the sister group to vertebrates. Living hagfish remain similar to hagfish from around 300 million years ago. The lampreys are a very ancient lineage of vertebrates, though their exact relationship to hagfishes and jawed vertebrates is still a matter of dispute. Molecular analysis since 1992 has suggested that hagfish are most closely related to lampreys, and so also are vertebrates in a monophyletic sense. Others consider them a sister group of vertebrates in the common taxon of craniata.

The Tully monster is an extinct genus of soft-bodied bilaterians that lived in tropical estuaries about 300 million years ago. Since 2016 there has been controversy over whether this animal was a vertebrate or an invertebrate. In 2020 researchers found "strong evidence" that the Tully monster was a vertebrate, and was a jawless fish in the lineage of the lamprey, while in 2023 other researchers found 3D fossils scans did not support those conclusions.

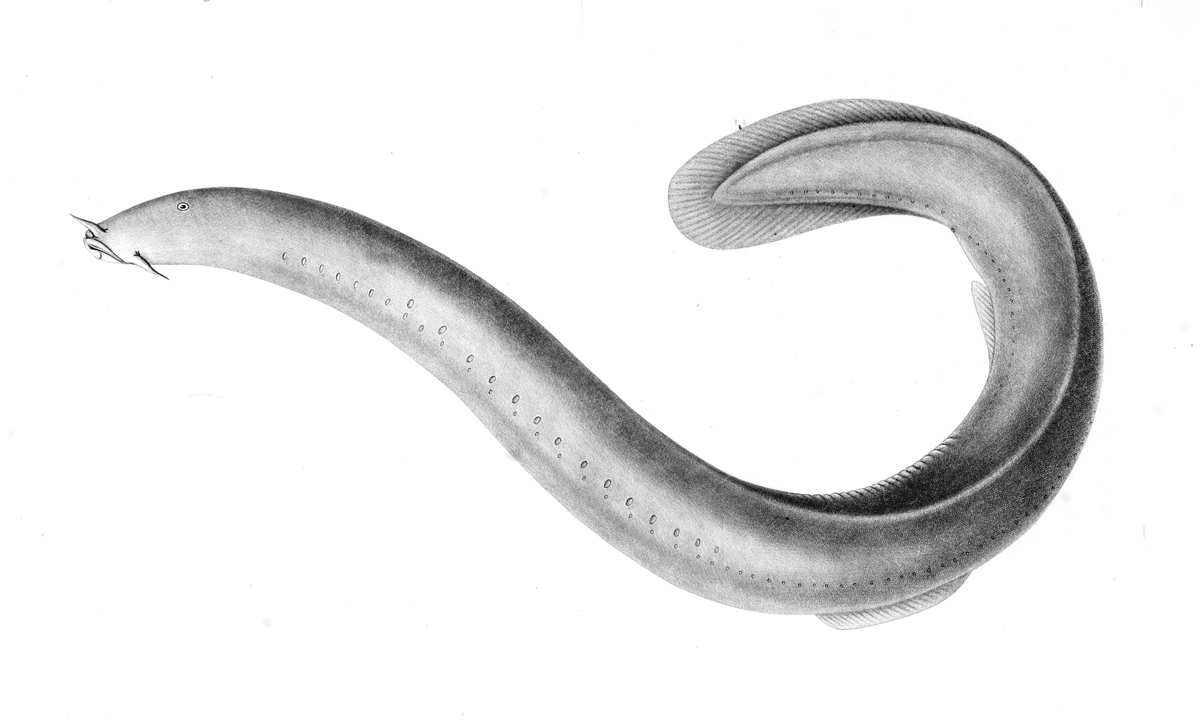
Hagfish are the only known living animals with a skull but no vertebral column.

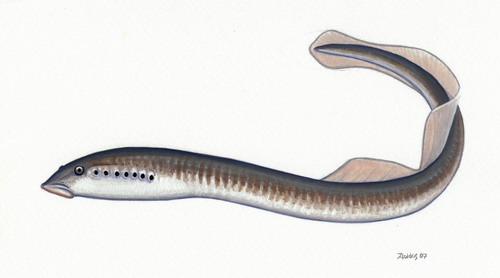
Lampreys are often parasitic and have a toothed, funnel-like sucking mouth.

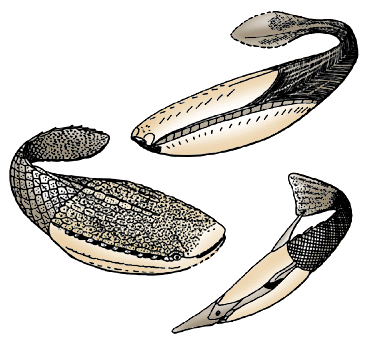
The extinct Pteraspidomorphi, ancestral to jawed vertebrates

Pteraspidomorphi is an extinct class of early jawless fish ancestral to jawed vertebrates. The few characteristics they share with the latter are now considered as primitive for all vertebrates.

Around the start of the Devonian, fish started appearing with a deep remodelling of the vertebrate skull that resulted in a jaw. All vertebrate jaws, including the human jaw, have evolved from these early fish jaws. The appearance of the early vertebrate jaw has been described as "perhaps the most profound and radical evolutionary step in vertebrate history". Jaws make it possible to capture, hold, and chew prey. Fish without jaws had more difficulty surviving than fish with jaws, and most jawless fish became extinct during the Triassic period.

==== Cartilaginous fish ====
Jawed fish fall into two main groups: fish with bony internal skeletons and fish with cartilaginous internal skeletons. Cartilaginous fish, such as sharks and rays, have jaws and skeletons made of cartilage rather than bone. Megalodon is an extinct species of shark that lived about 28 to 1.5 Ma. It may looked much like a stocky version of the great white shark, but was much larger with estimated lengths reaching 20.3 metres (67 ft). Found in all oceans it was one of the largest and most powerful predators in vertebrate history, and probably had a profound impact on marine life. The Greenland shark has the longest known lifespan of all vertebrates, about 400 years. Some sharks such as the great white are partially warm blooded and give live birth. The manta ray, largest ray in the world, has been targeted by fisheries and is now vulnerable.

Cartilaginous fishes

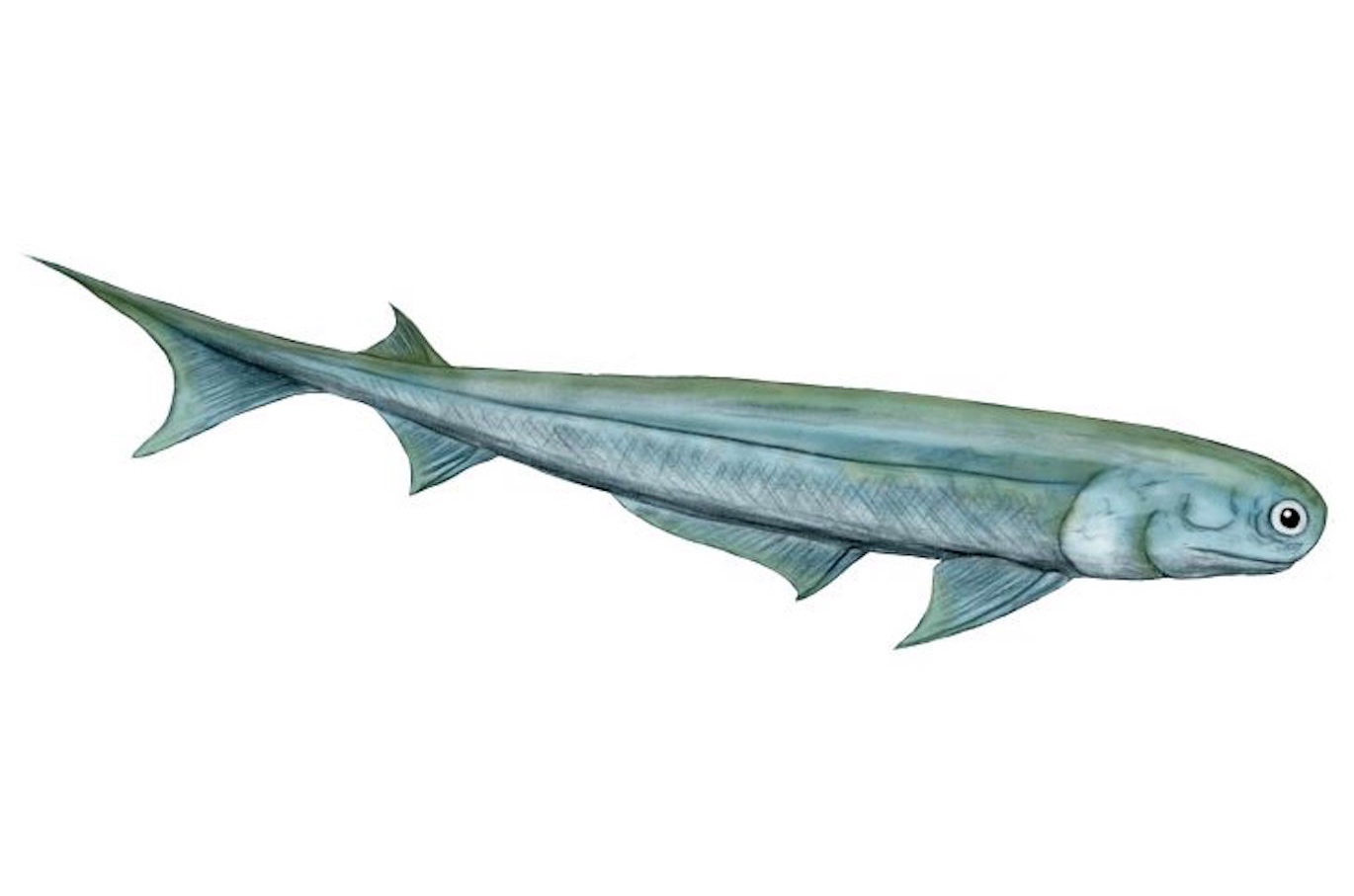
Cartilaginous fishes may have evolved from spiny sharks.

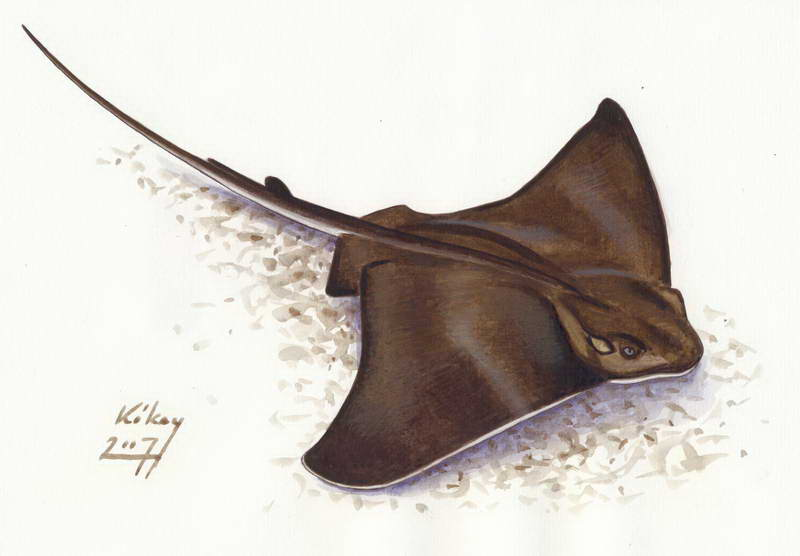
Stingray

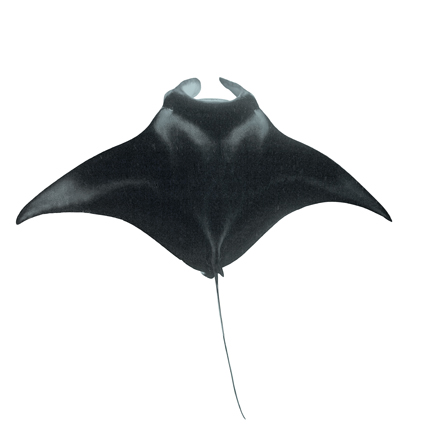
Manta ray, the largest ray

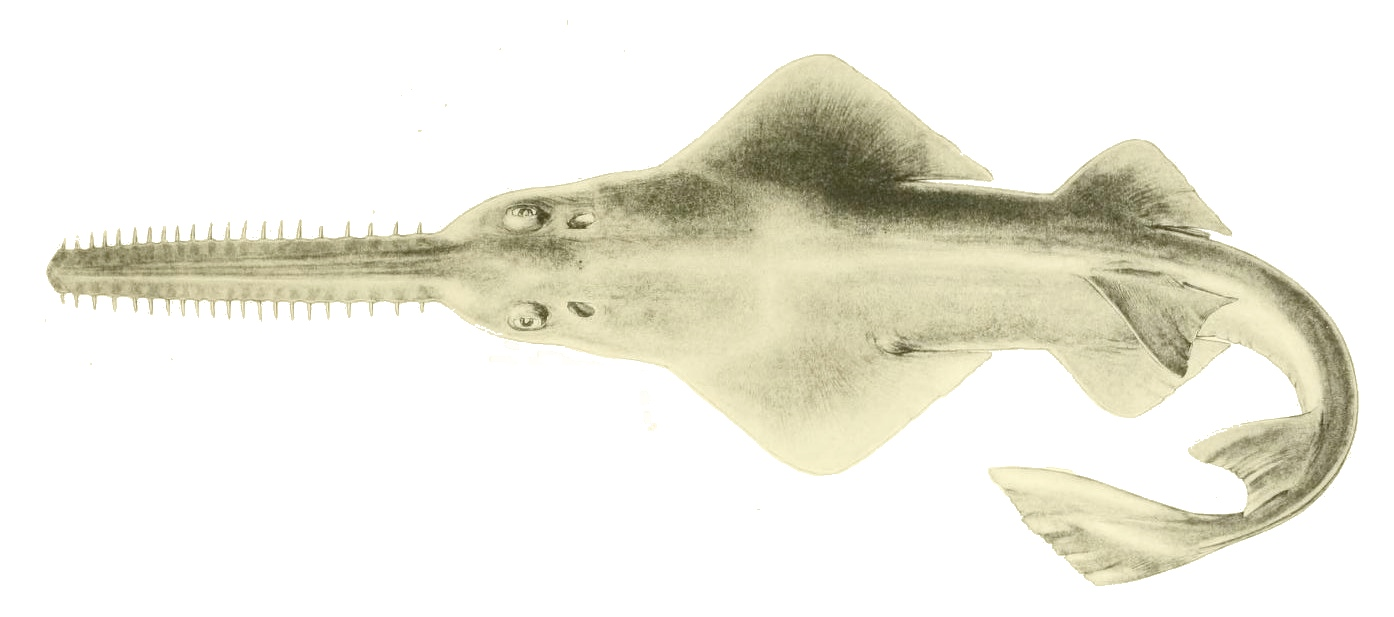
Sawfish, rays with long rostrums resembling a saw. All species are now endangered.
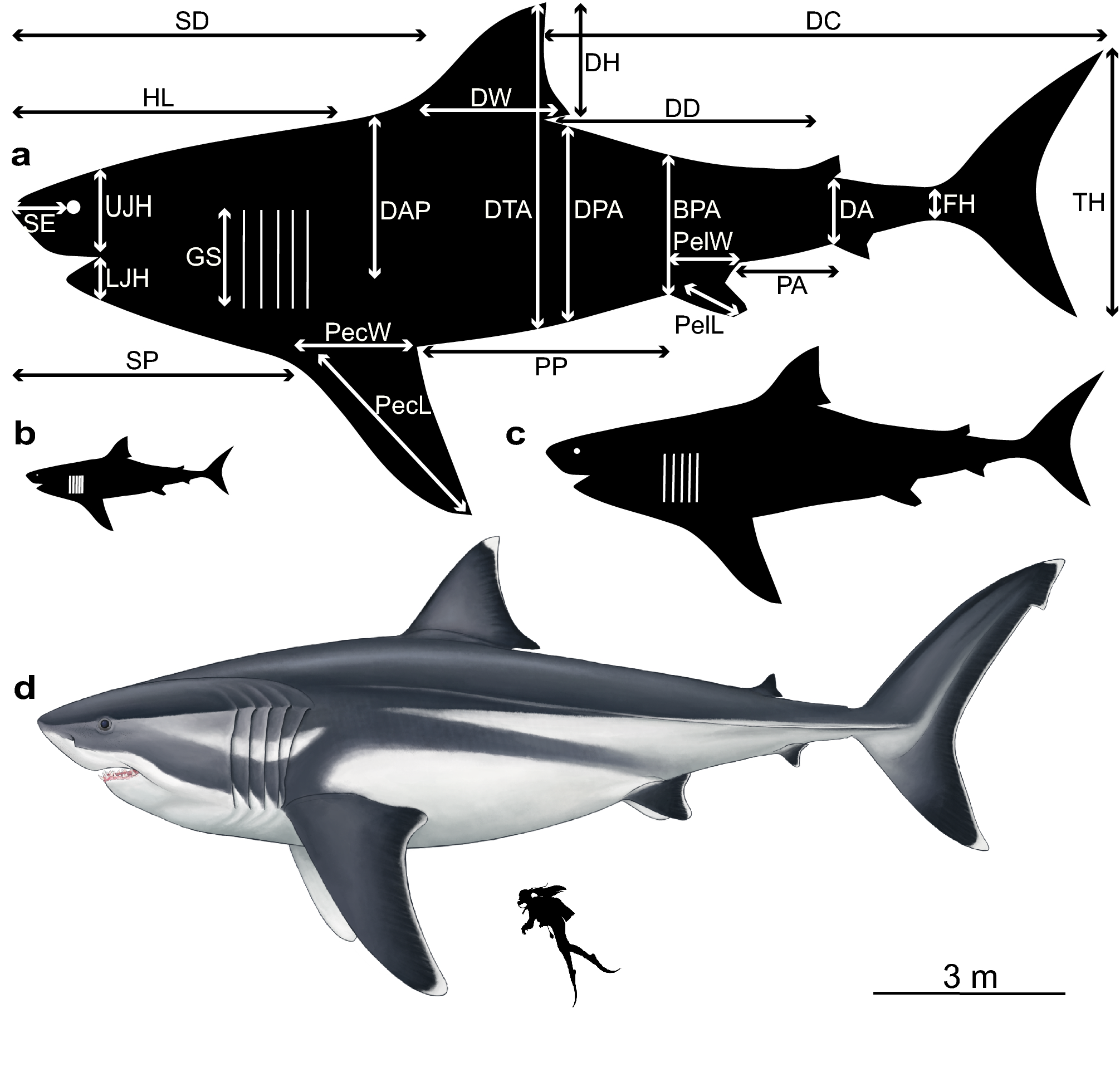
The extinct megalodon resembled a giant great white shark.

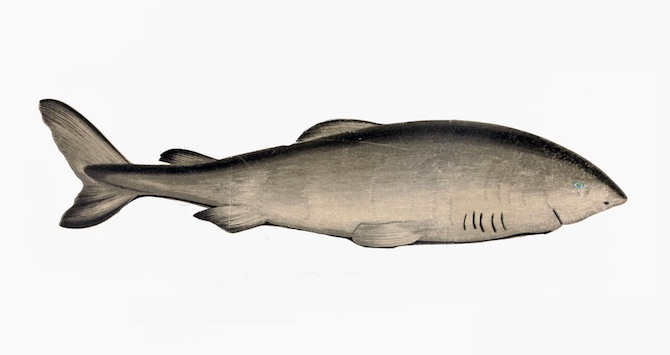
The Greenland shark lives longer than any other vertebrate.

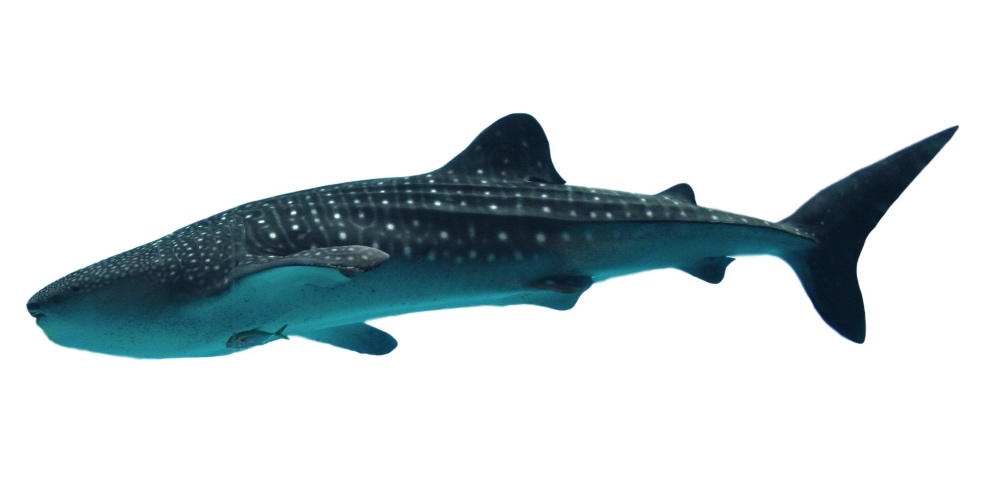
The largest extant fish, the whale shark, is now a vulnerable species.

==== Bony fish ====
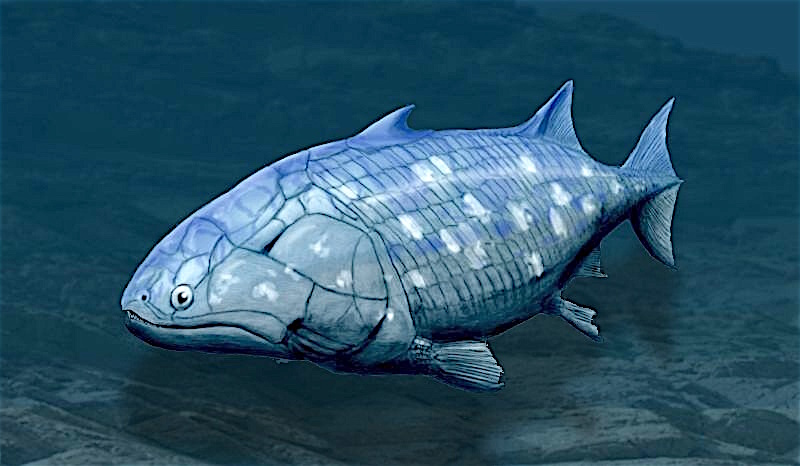
Guiyu oneiros, the earliest-known bony fish lived during the Late Silurian 419 million years ago.

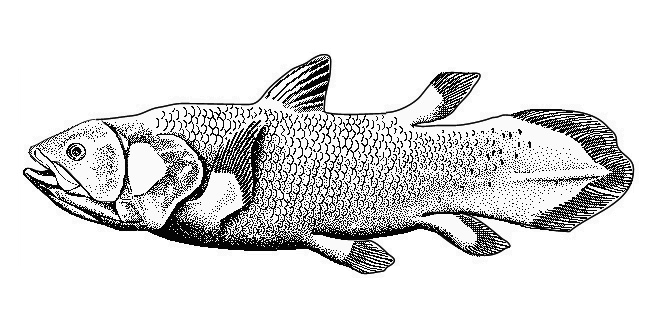
Lobe fins are bedded into the body by bony stalks. They evolved into the legs of the first tetrapod land vertebrates.

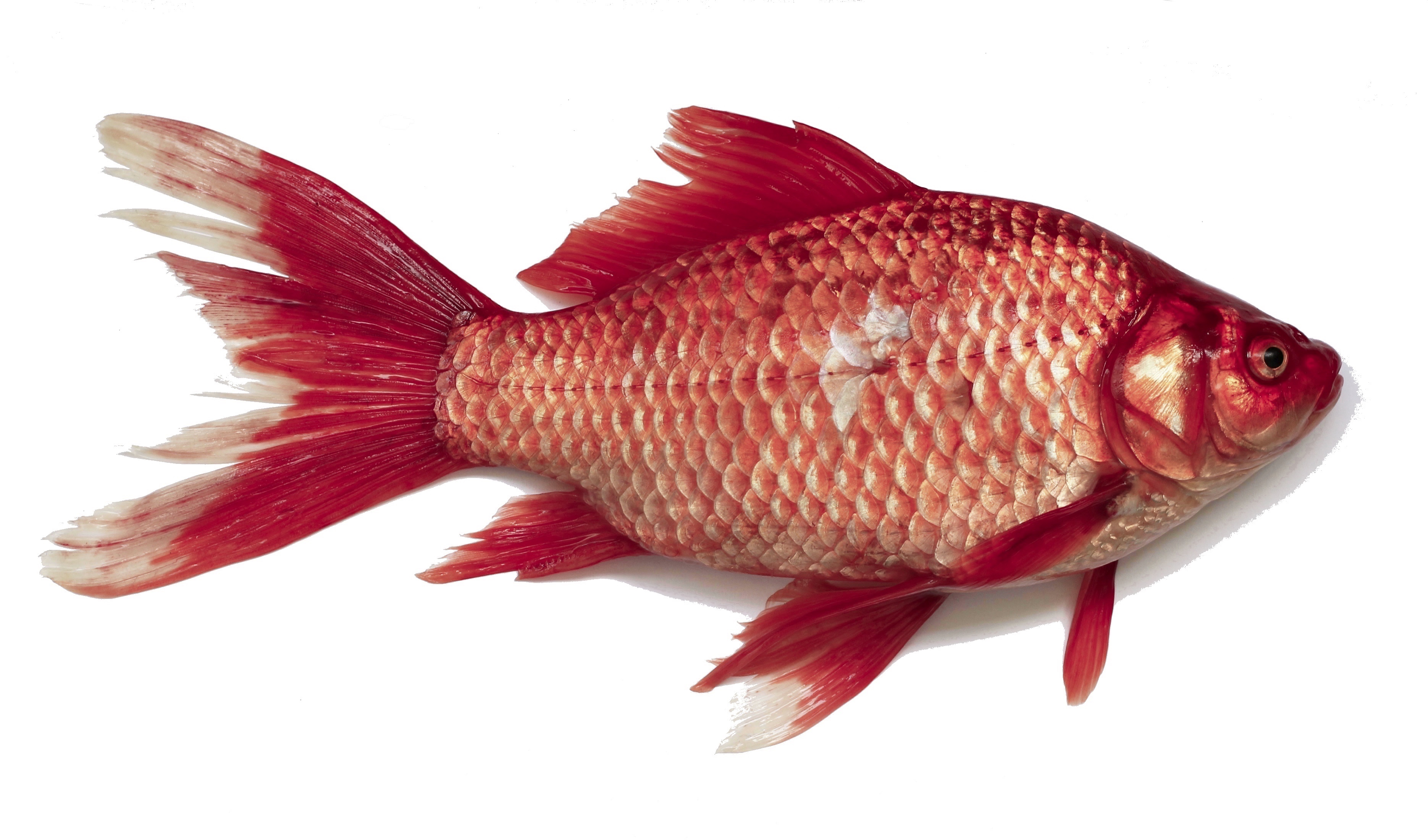
Ray fins have spines (rays) which can be erected to stiffen the fin for better control of swimming performance.

Bony fish have jaws and skeletons made of bone rather than cartilage. Bony fish also have hard, bony plates called operculum which help them respire and protect their gills, and they often possess a swim bladder which they use for better control of their buoyancy. Bony fish can be further divided into those with lobe fins and those with ray fins. The approximate dates in the phylogenetic tree are from Near et al., 2012 and Zhu et al., 2009.

- ← bony fish (extant)
  - lobe fins 419 mya
    - coelacanths
    - - lungfish
      - - tetrapods →
  - ray fins 400 mya
    - chondrosteans
      (sturgeon, paddlefish, bichir, reedfish)
    - neopterygians 360 mya
      - holosteans 275 mya
        (bowfin, gars)
      - teleosts 310 mya
        all remaining fish (about 14,000 marine species)

Lobe fins have the form of fleshy lobes supported by bony stalks which extend from the body. Guiyu oneiros, the earliest-known bony fish, lived during the Late Silurian 419 million years ago. It has the combination of both ray-finned and lobe-finned features, although analysis of the totality of its features place it closer to lobe-finned fish. Lobe fins evolved into the legs of the first tetrapod land vertebrates, so by extension an early ancestor of humans was a lobe-finned fish. Apart from the coelacanths and the lungfishes, lobe-finned fishes are now extinct.

The remaining bony fish have ray fins. These are made of webs of skin supported by bony or horny spines (rays) which can be erected to control the fin stiffness.

- The main distinguishing feature of the chondrosteans (sturgeon, paddlefish, bichir and reedfish) is the cartilaginous nature of their skeletons. The ancestors of the chondrosteans are thought to be bony fish, but the characteristic of an ossified skeleton was lost in later evolutionary development, resulting in a lightening of the frame.
- Neopterygians (from Greek for new fins) appeared sometime in the Late Permian, before dinosaurs. They were a very successful group of fish, because they could move more rapidly than their ancestors. Their scales and skeletons began to lighten during their evolution, and their jaws became more powerful and efficient.

==== Teleosts ====
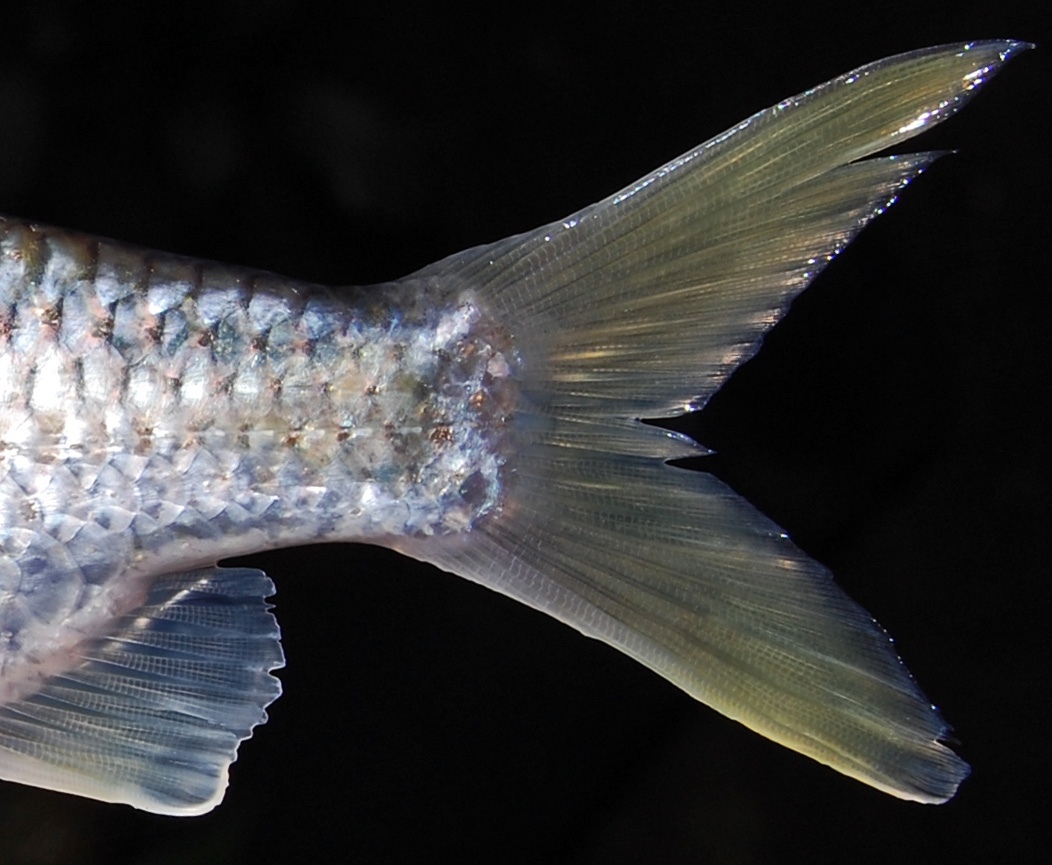
Teleosts have homocercal tails, where the upper half mirrors the lower half.

About 96% of all modern fish species are teleosts, of which about 14,000 are marine species. Teleosts can be distinguished from other bony fish by their possession of a homocercal tail, a tail where the upper half mirrors the lower half. Another difference lies in their jaw bones – teleosts have modifications in the jaw musculature which make it possible for them to protrude their jaws. This enables them to grab prey and draw it into their mouth. In general, teleosts tend to be quicker and more flexible than more basal bony fishes. Their skeletal structure has evolved towards greater lightness. While teleost bones are well calcified, they are constructed from a scaffolding of struts, rather than the dense cancellous bones of holostean fish.

Teleosts are found in almost all marine habitats. They have enormous diversity, and range in size from adult gobies 8mm long to ocean sunfish weighing over 2,000 kg. The following images show something of the diversity in the shape and colour of modern marine teleosts...

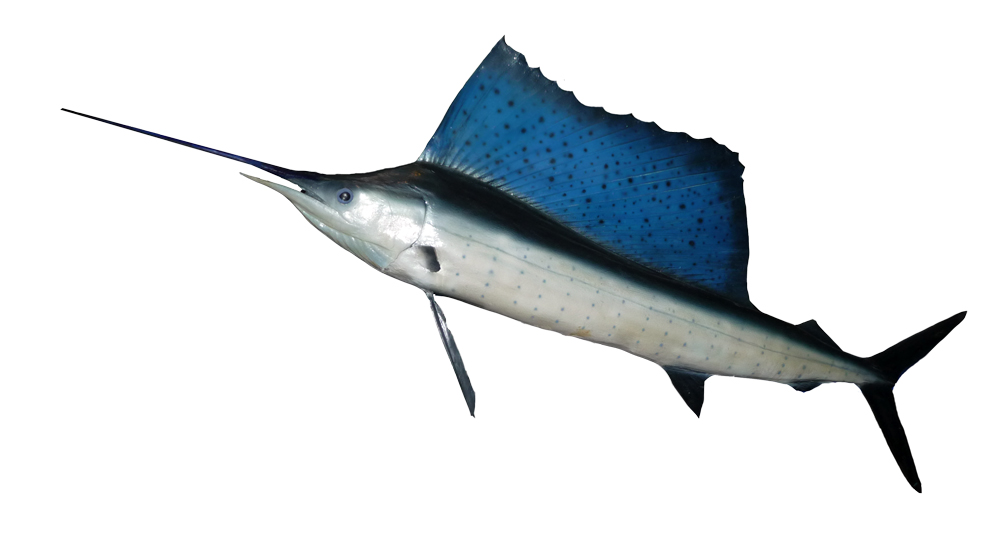
Sailfish

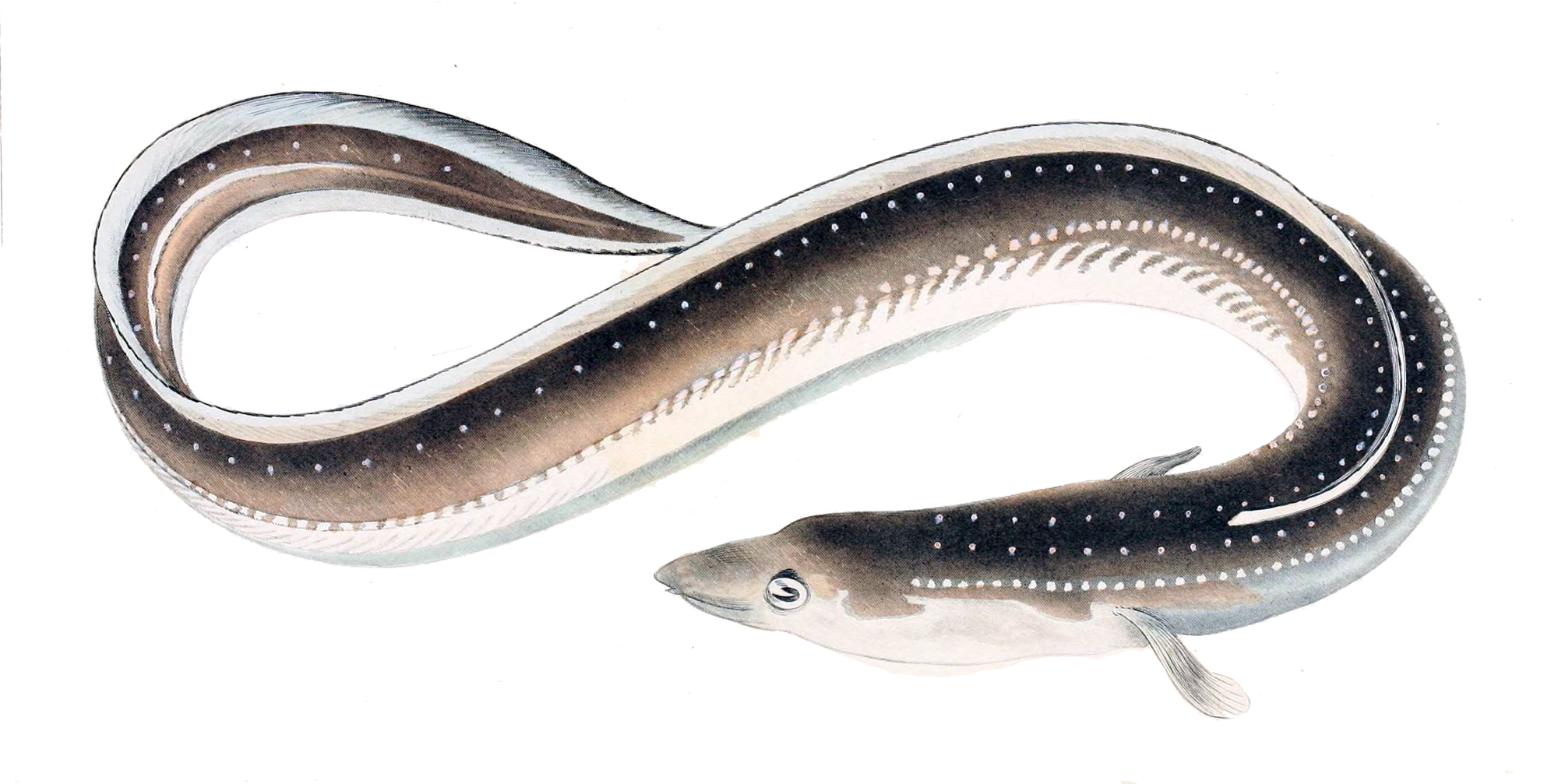
Eel

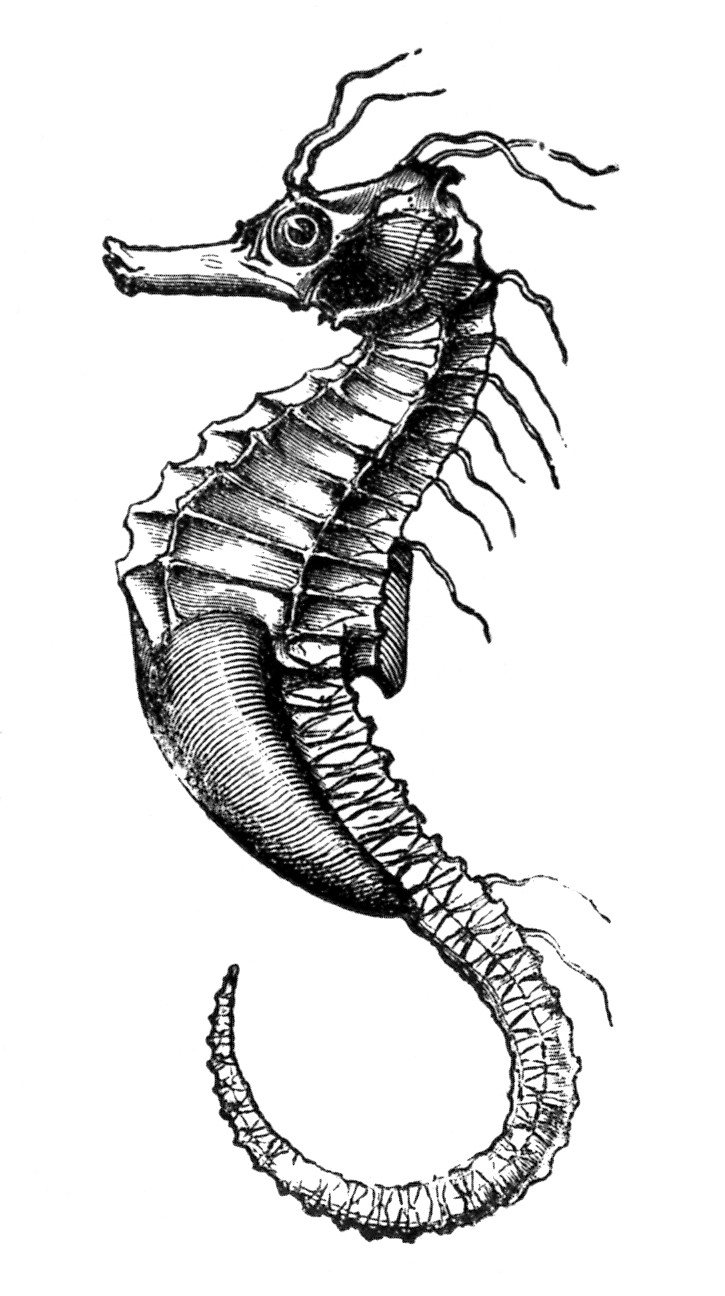
Seahorse
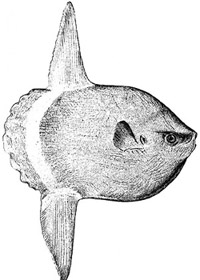
Ocean sunfish

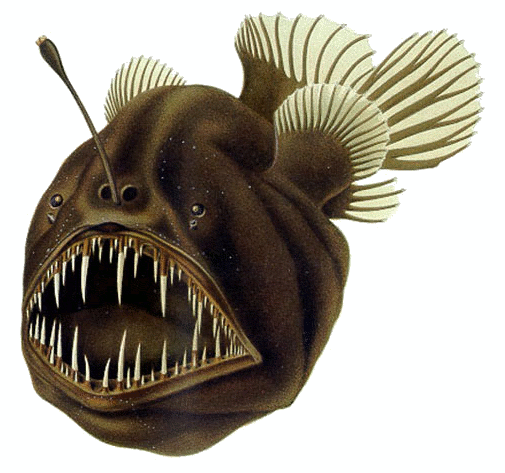
Anglerfish

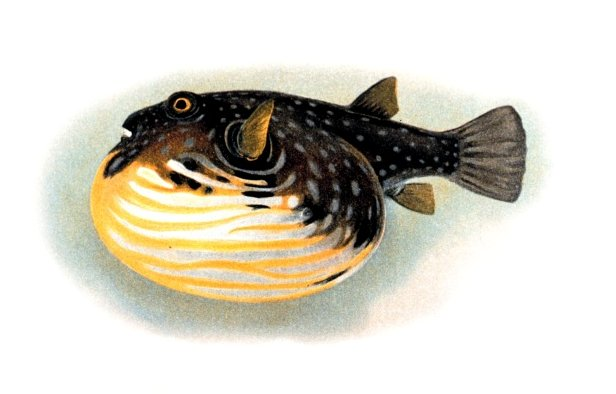
Pufferfish

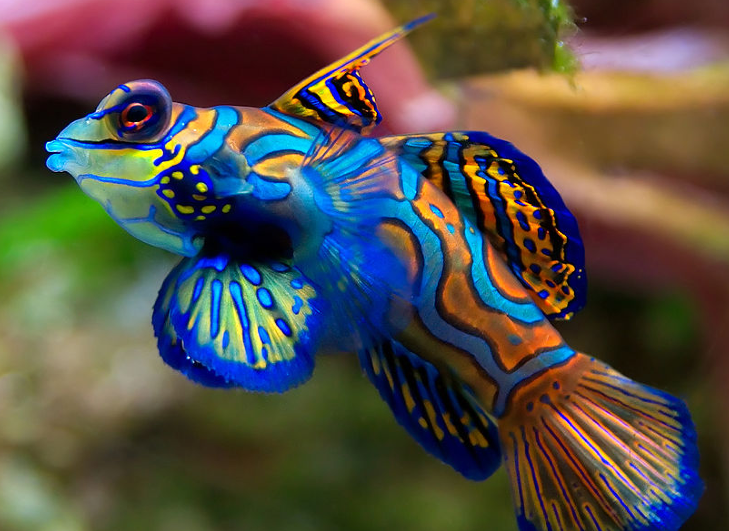
Mandarin dragonet

Nearly half of all extant vertebrate species are teleosts.

=== Marine tetrapods ===
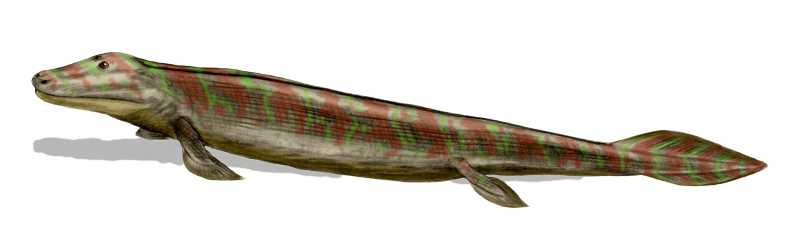
Tiktaalik, an extinct lobe-finned fish, developed limb-like fins that could take it onto land.

A tetrapod (Greek for four feet) is a vertebrate with limbs (feet). Tetrapods evolved from ancient lobe-finned fishes about 400 million years ago during the Devonian Period when their earliest ancestors emerged from the sea and adapted to living on land. This change from a body plan for breathing and navigating in gravity-neutral water to a body plan with mechanisms enabling the animal to breathe in air without dehydrating and move on land is one of the most profound evolutionary changes known. Tetrapods can be divided into four classes: amphibians, reptiles, birds and mammals.

- ← tetrapods
  - amphibians (there are no true marine amphibians)
  - amniotes
    - mammals
    - sauropsids
      - lepidosaurs (lizards, including snakes)
      - archosaurs (turtles, crocodiles & birds)

Marine tetrapods are tetrapods that returned from land back to the sea again. The first returns to the ocean may have occurred as early as the Carboniferous Period whereas other returns occurred as recently as the Cenozoic, as in cetaceans, pinnipeds, and several modern amphibians. Amphibians (from Greek for both kinds of life) live part of their life in water and part on land. They mostly require fresh water to reproduce. A few inhabit brackish water, but there are no true marine amphibians. There have been reports, however, of amphibians invading marine waters, such as a Black Sea invasion by the natural hybrid Pelophylax esculentus reported in 2010.

==== Reptiles ====
Reptiles (Late Latin for creeping or crawling) do not have an aquatic larval stage, and in this way are unlike amphibians. Most reptiles are oviparous, although several species of squamates are viviparous, as were some extinct aquatic clades — the fetus develops within the mother, contained in a placenta rather than an eggshell. As amniotes, reptile eggs are surrounded by membranes for protection and transport, which adapt them to reproduction on dry land. Many of the viviparous species feed their fetuses through various forms of placenta analogous to those of mammals, with some providing initial care for their hatchlings.

Some reptiles are more closely related to birds than other reptiles, and many scientists prefer to make Reptilia a monophyletic group which includes the birds. Extant non-avian reptiles which inhabit or frequent the sea include sea turtles, sea snakes, terrapins, the marine iguana, and the saltwater crocodile. Currently, of the approximately 12,000 extant reptile species and sub-species, only about 100 of are classed as marine reptiles.

Except for some sea snakes, most extant marine reptiles are oviparous and need to return to land to lay their eggs. Apart from sea turtles, the species usually spend most of their lives on or near land rather than in the ocean. Sea snakes generally prefer shallow waters nearby land, around islands, especially waters that are somewhat sheltered, as well as near estuaries. Unlike land snakes, sea snakes have evolved flattened tails which help them swim.

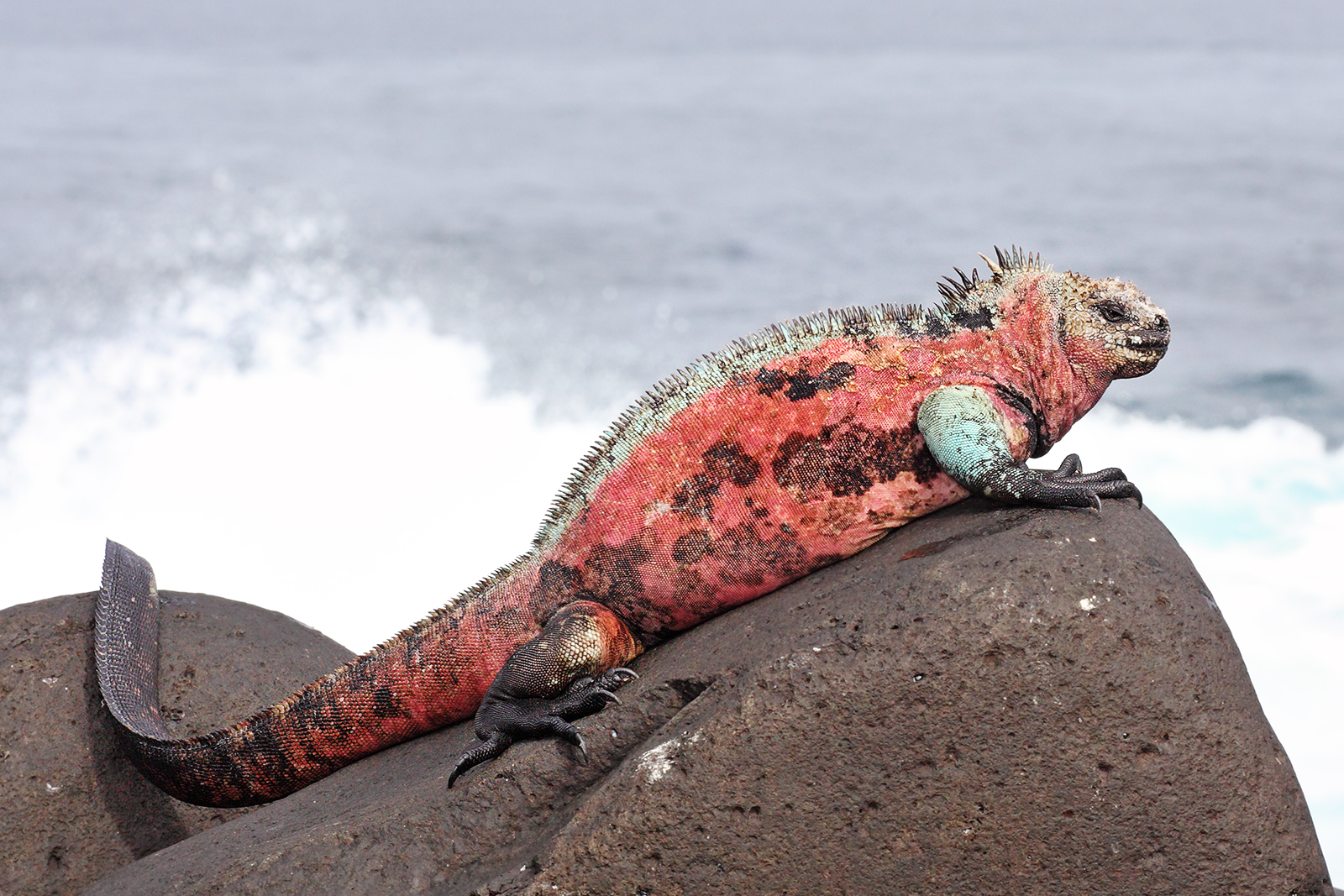
Marine iguana

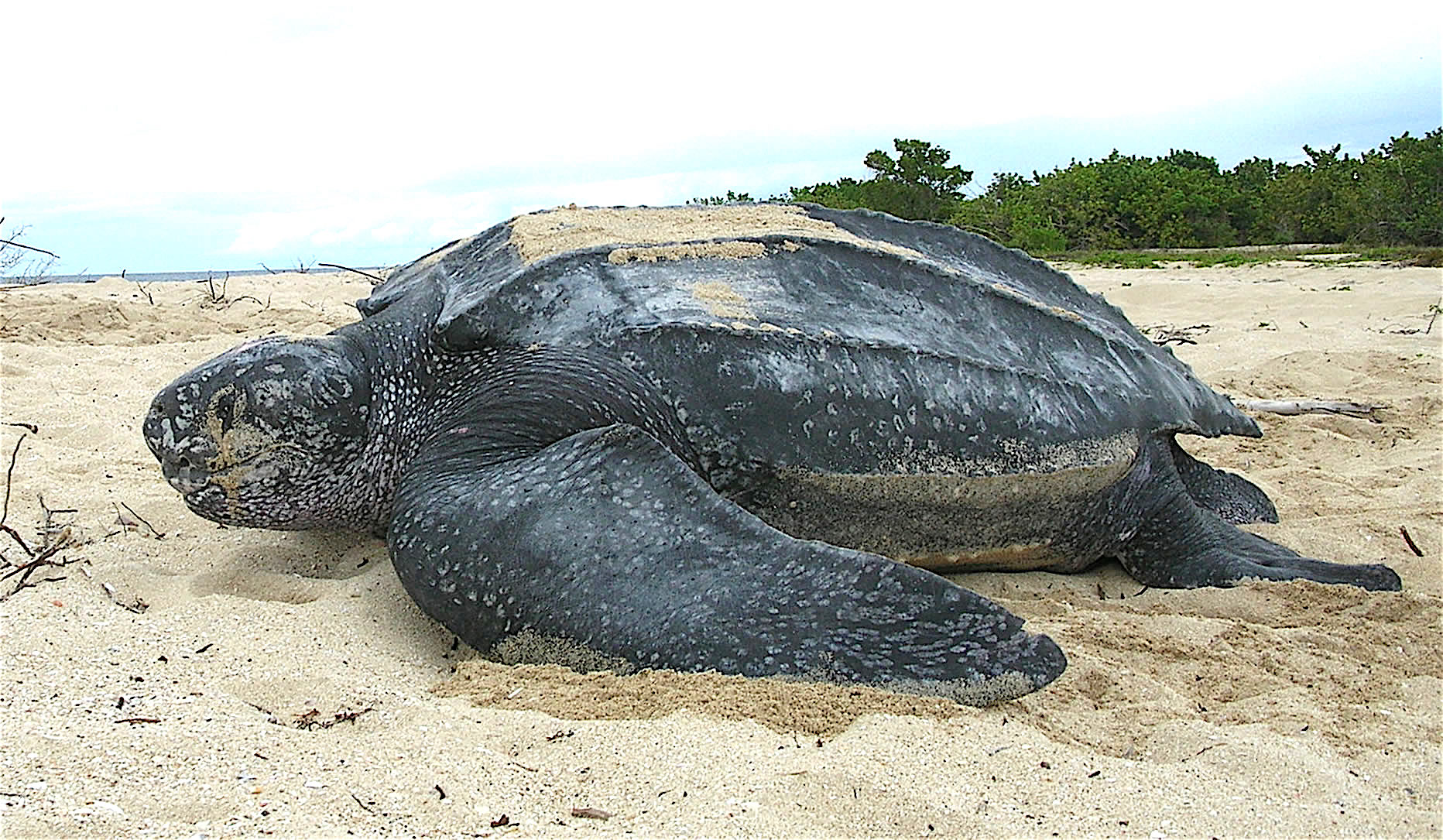
Leatherback sea turtle

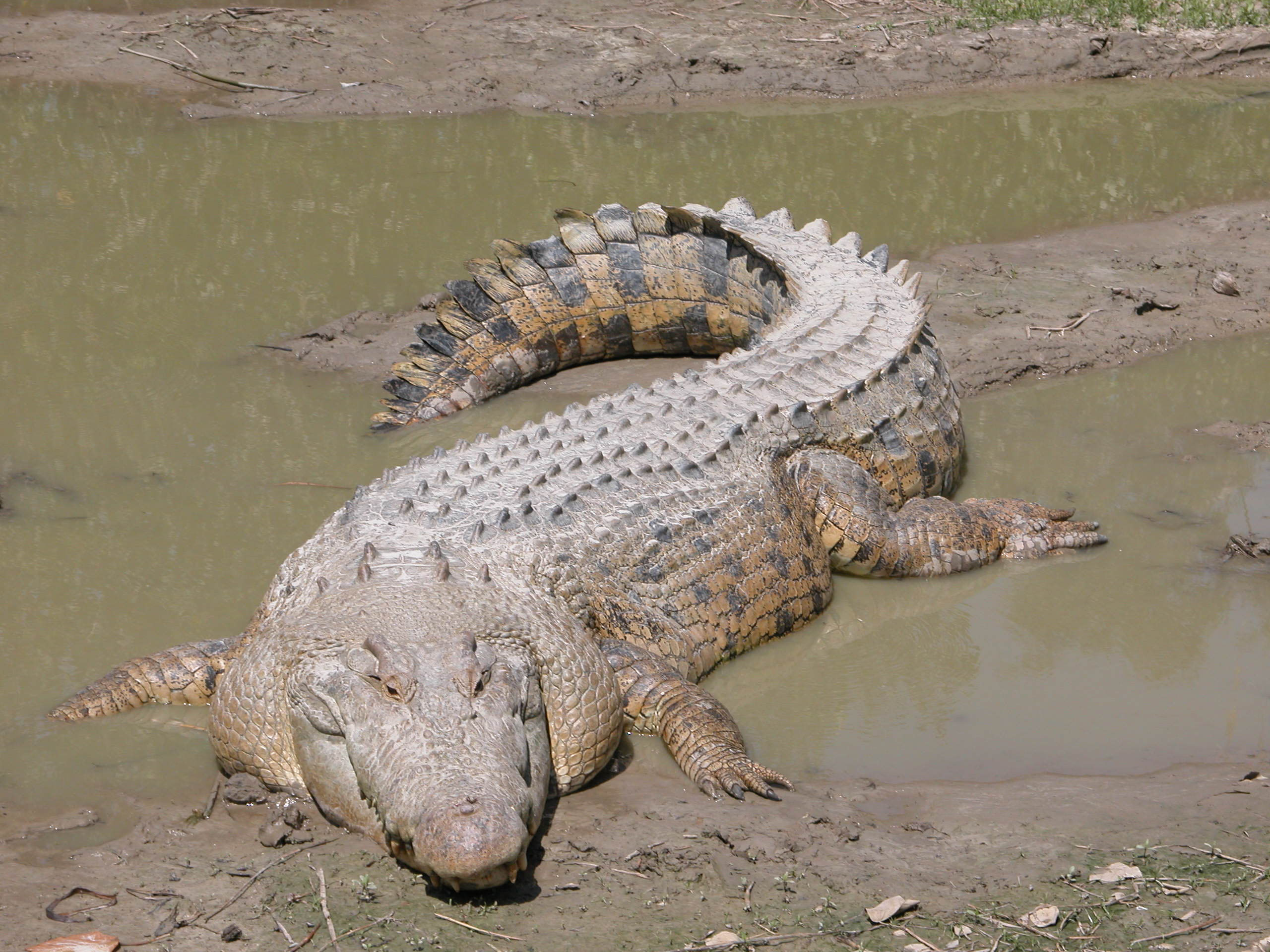
Saltwater crocodile

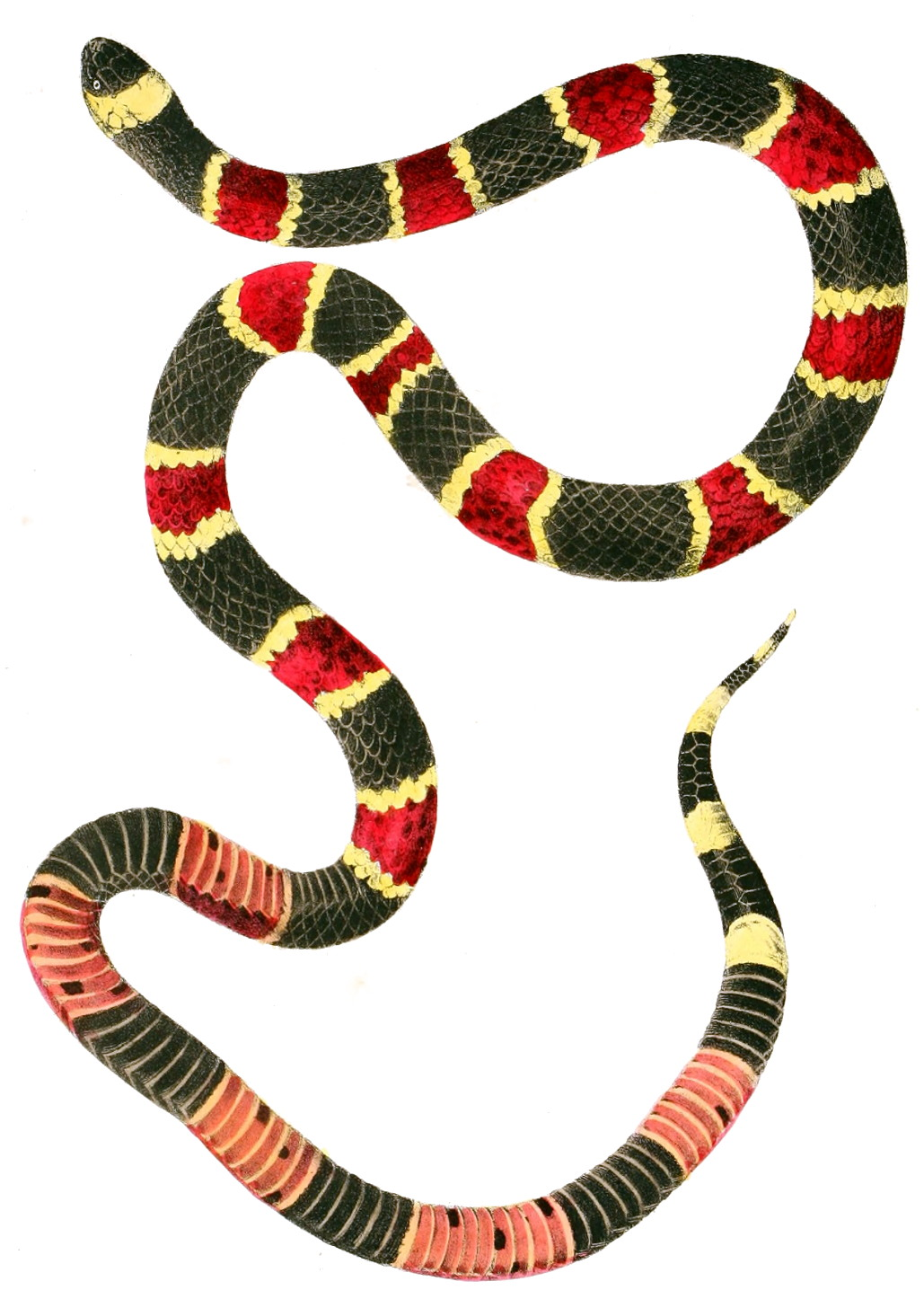
Marine snakes have flattened tails.

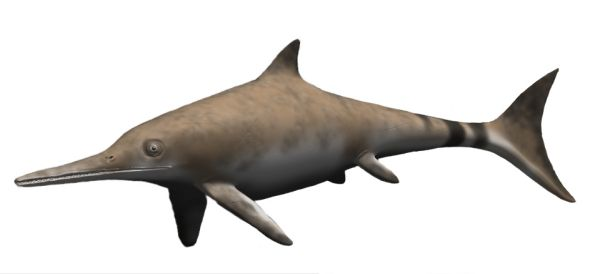
The ancient Ichthyosaurus communis independently evolved flippers similar to dolphins.

Some extinct marine reptiles, such as ichthyosaurs, evolved to be viviparous and had no requirement to return to land. Ichthyosaurs resembled dolphins. They first appeared about 245 million years ago and disappeared about 90 million years ago. The terrestrial ancestor of the ichthyosaur had no features already on its back or tail that might have helped along the evolutionary process. Yet the ichthyosaur developed a dorsal and tail fin which improved its ability to swim. The biologist Stephen Jay Gould said the ichthyosaur was his favourite example of convergent evolution. The earliest marine reptiles arose in the Permian. During the Mesozoic many groups of reptiles became adapted to life in the seas, including ichthyosaurs, plesiosaurs, mosasaurs, nothosaurs, placodonts, sea turtles, thalattosaurs and thalattosuchians. Marine reptiles were less numerous after mass extinction at the end of the Cretaceous.

==== Birds ====
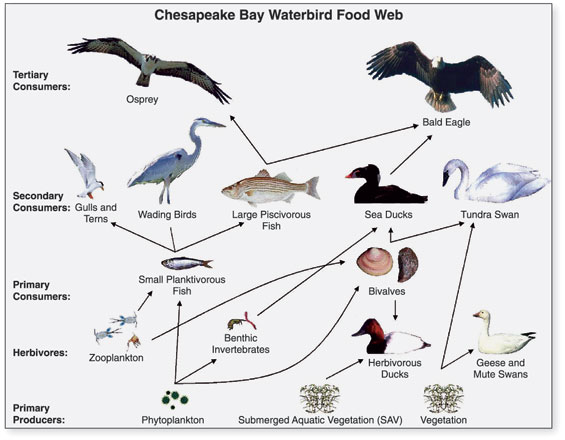
Waterbird food web in Chesapeake Bay

Marine birds are adapted to life within the marine environment. They are often called seabirds. While marine birds vary greatly in lifestyle, behaviour and physiology, they often exhibit striking convergent evolution, as the same environmental problems and feeding niches have resulted in similar adaptations. Examples include albatross, penguins, gannets, and auks.

In general, marine birds live longer, breed later and have fewer young than terrestrial birds do, but they invest a great deal of time in their young. Most species nest in colonies, which can vary in size from a few dozen birds to millions. Many species are famous for undertaking long annual migrations, crossing the equator or circumnavigating the Earth in some cases. They feed both at the ocean's surface and below it, and even feed on each other. Marine birds can be highly pelagic, coastal, or in some cases spend a part of the year away from the sea entirely. Some marine birds plummet from heights, plunging through the water leaving vapour-like trails, similar to that of fighter planes. Gannets plunge into the water at up to 100 kilometres per hour (60 mph). They have air sacs under their skin in their face and chest which act like bubble-wrap, cushioning the impact with the water.

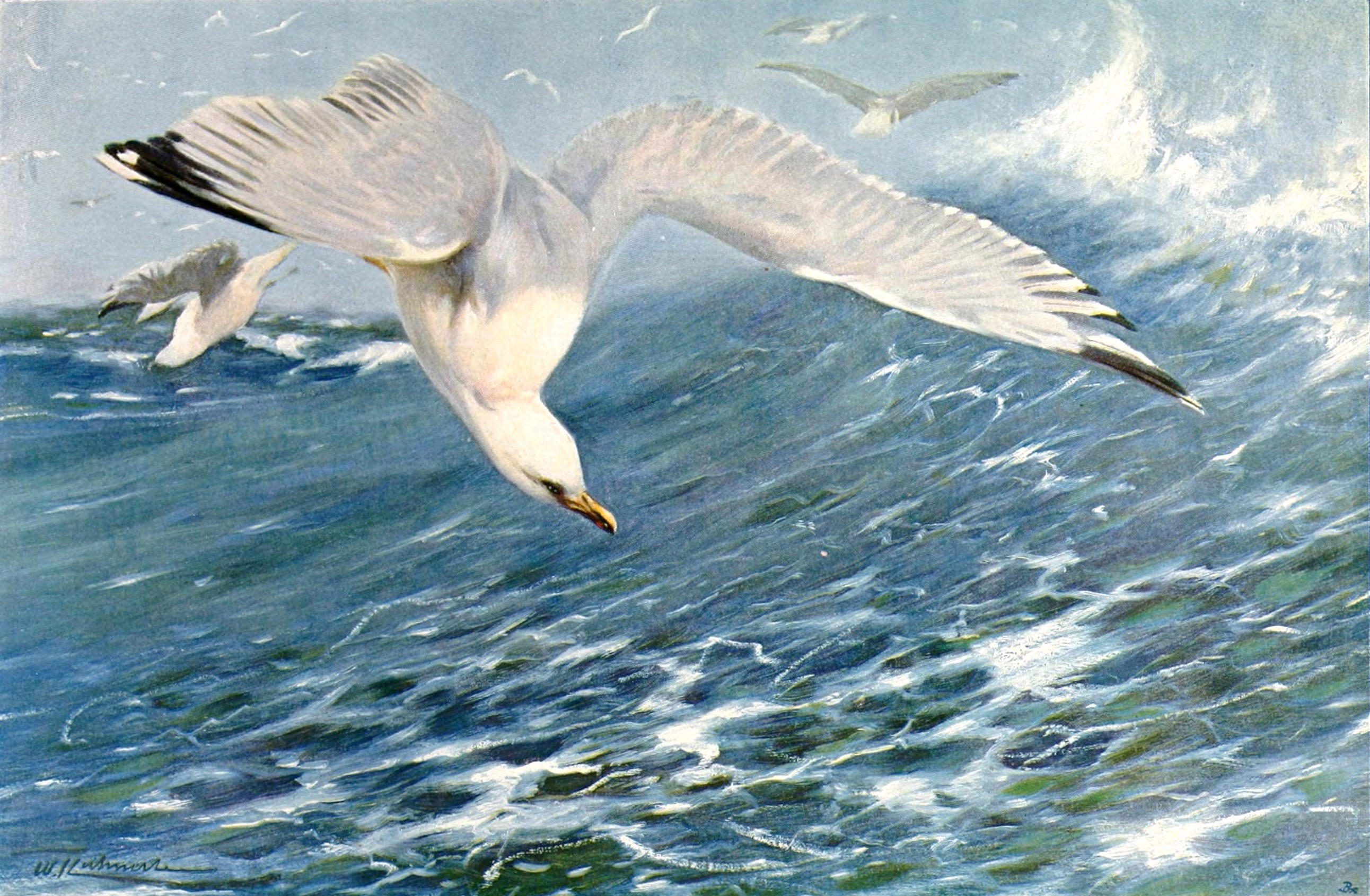
European herring gull attack herring schools from above.

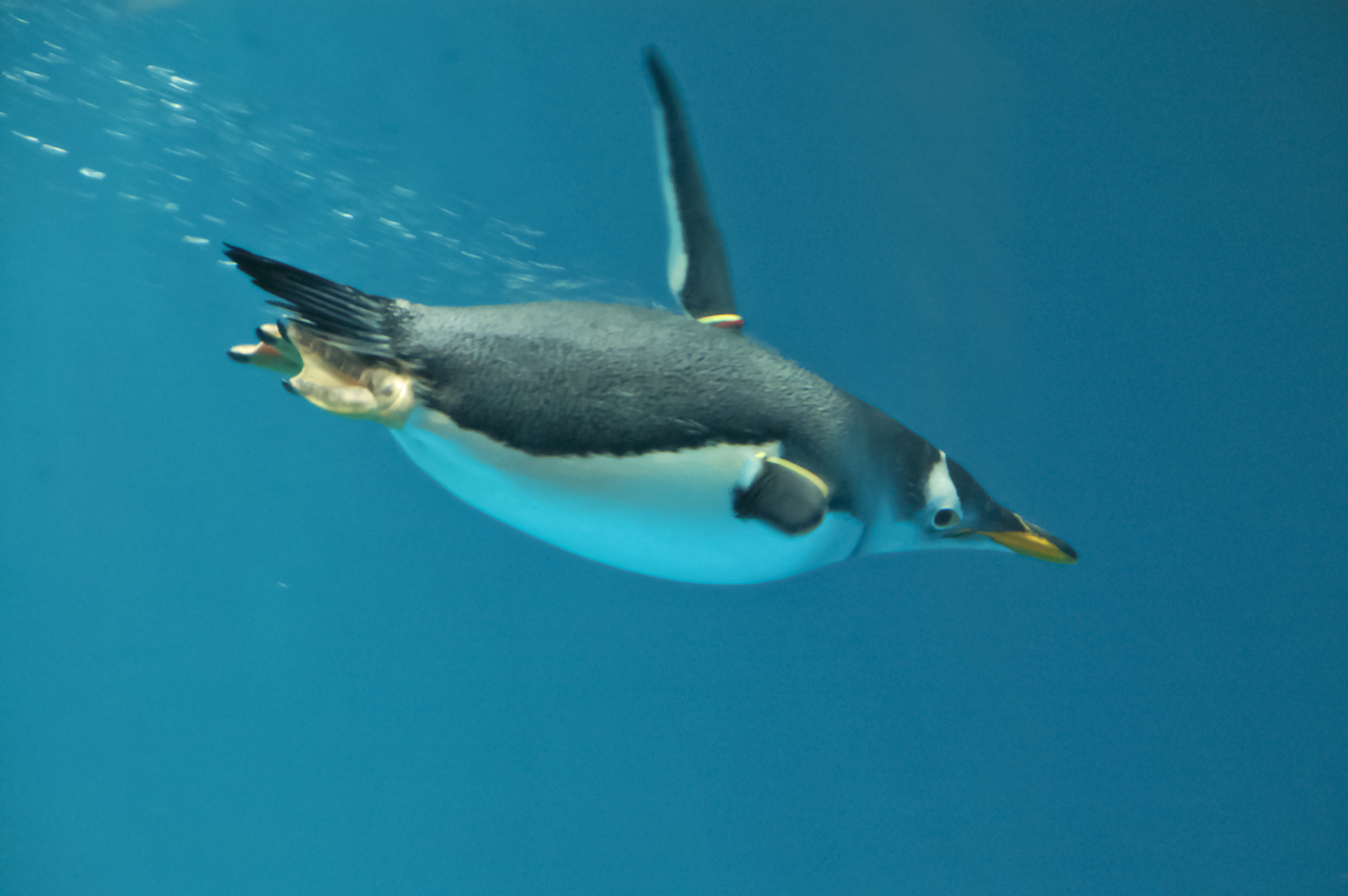
Gentoo penguin swimming underwater

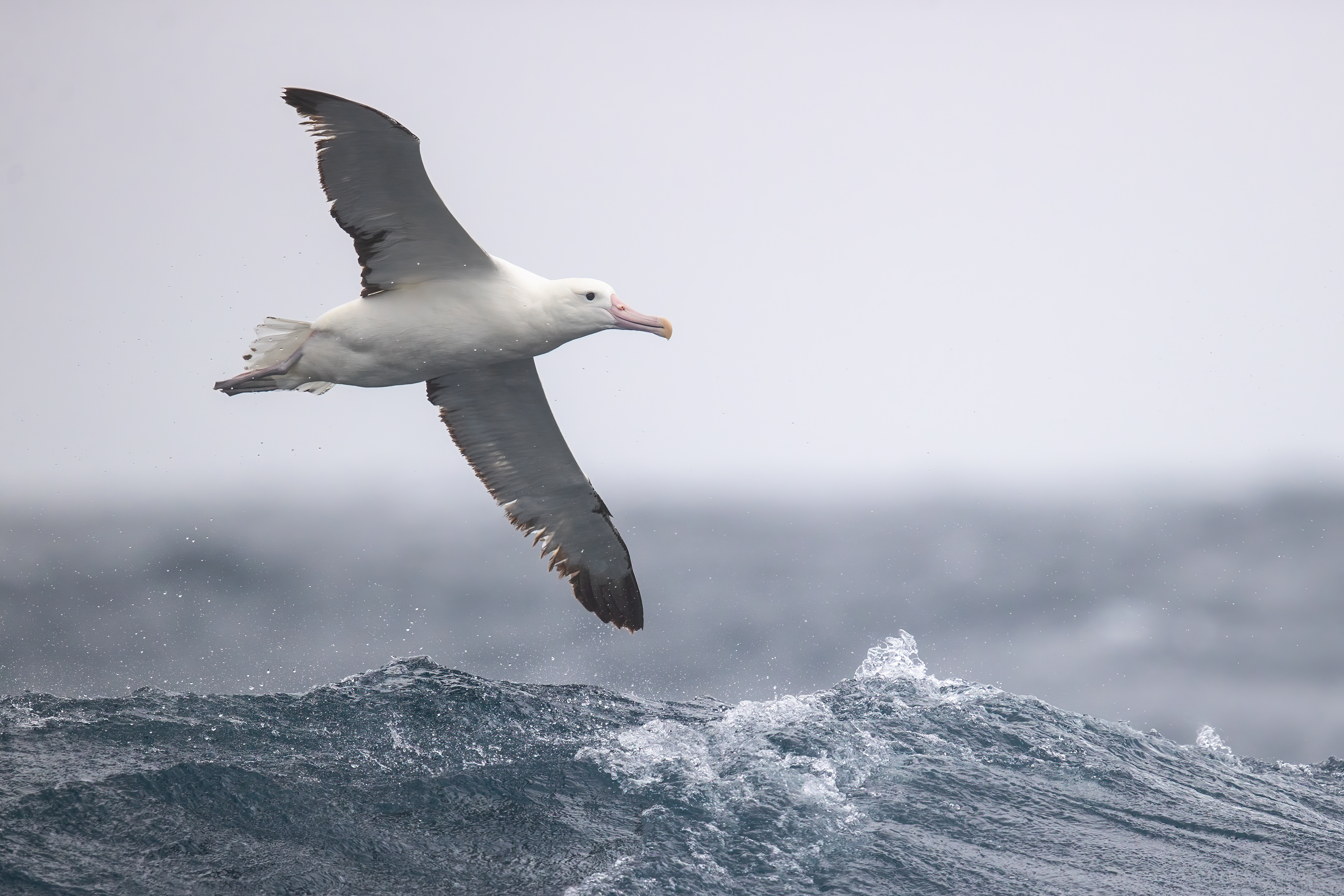
Albatrosses range over huge areas of ocean and some even circle the globe.

The first marine birds evolved in the Cretaceous period, and modern marine bird families emerged in the Paleogene.

==== Mammals ====
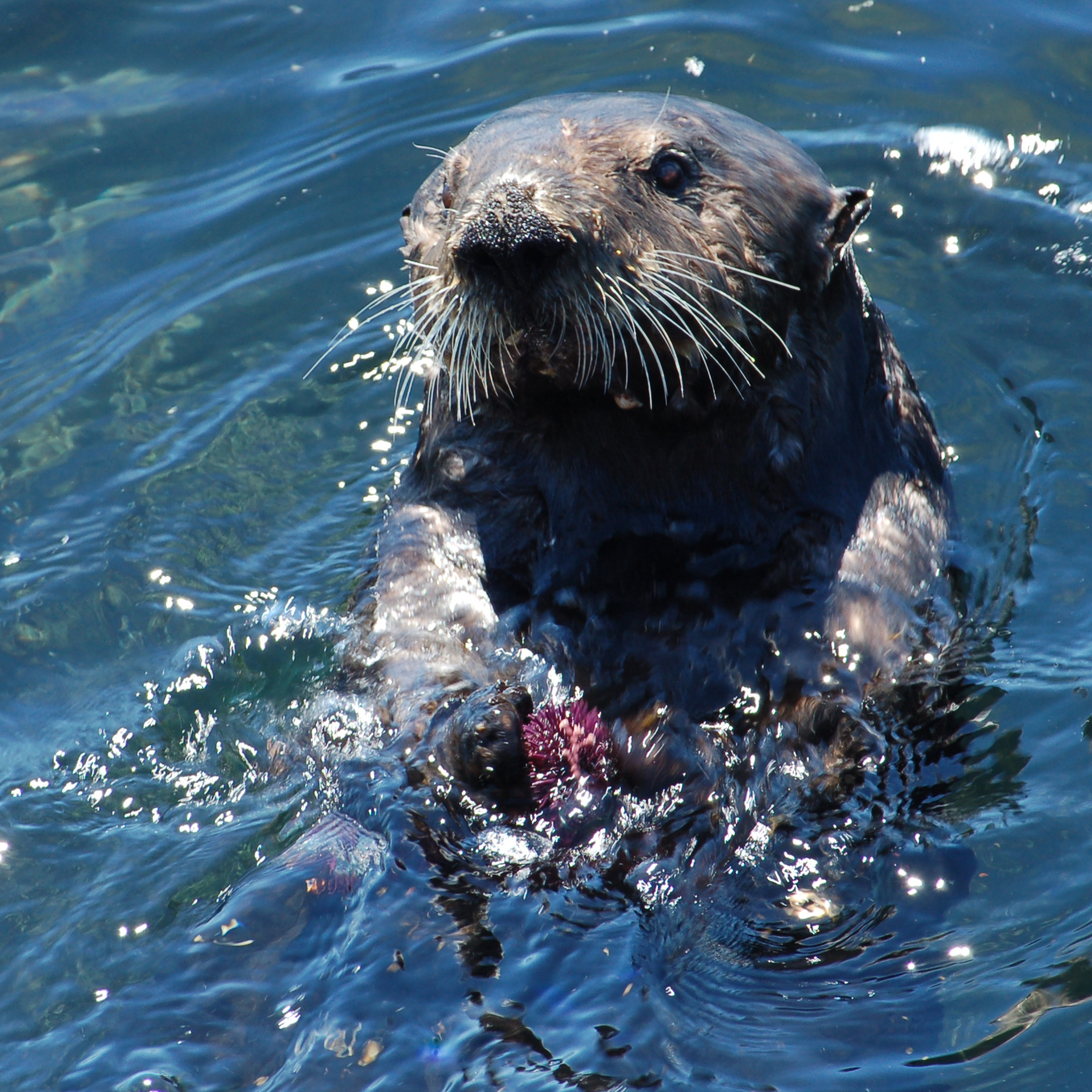
Sea otter, a classic keystone species which controls sea urchin numbers

Mammals (from Latin for breast) are characterised by the presence of mammary glands which in females produce milk for feeding (nursing) their young. There are about 130 living and recently extinct marine mammal species such as seals, dolphins, whales, manatees, sea otters and polar bears. They do not represent a distinct taxon or systematic grouping, but are instead unified by their reliance on the marine environment for feeding. Both cetaceans and sirenians are fully aquatic and therefore are obligate water dwellers. Seals and sea-lions are semiaquatic; they spend the majority of their time in the water, but need to return to land for important activities such as mating, breeding and molting. In contrast, both otters and the polar bear are much less adapted to aquatic living. Their diet varies considerably as well: some may eat zooplankton; others may eat fish, squid, shellfish, and sea-grass; and a few may eat other mammals.

In a process of convergent evolution, marine mammals, especially cetaceans such as dolphins and whales, redeveloped their body plan to parallel the streamlined fusiform body plan of pelagic fish. Front legs became flippers and back legs disappeared, a dorsal fin reappeared and the tail morphed into a powerful horizontal fluke. This body plan is an adaptation to being an active predator in a high drag environment. A parallel convergence occurred with the now extinct marine reptile ichthyosaur.

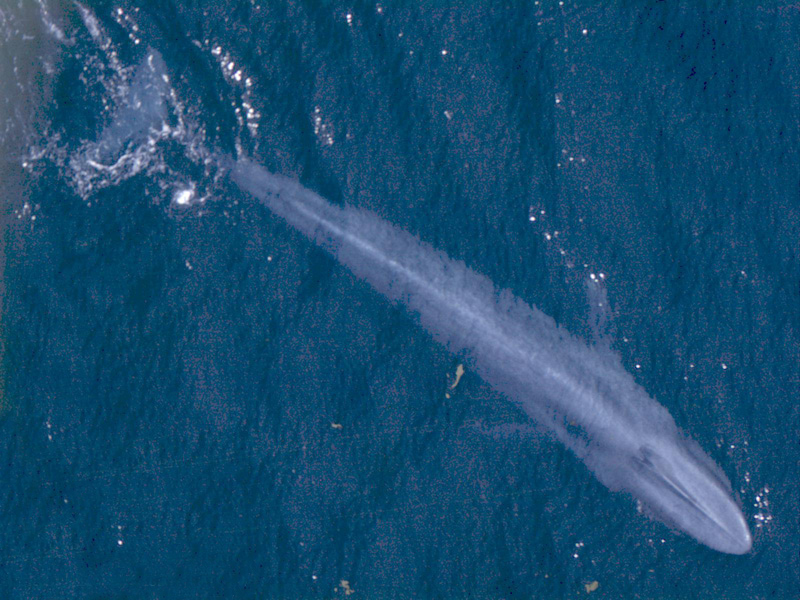
Endangered blue whale, the largest living animal

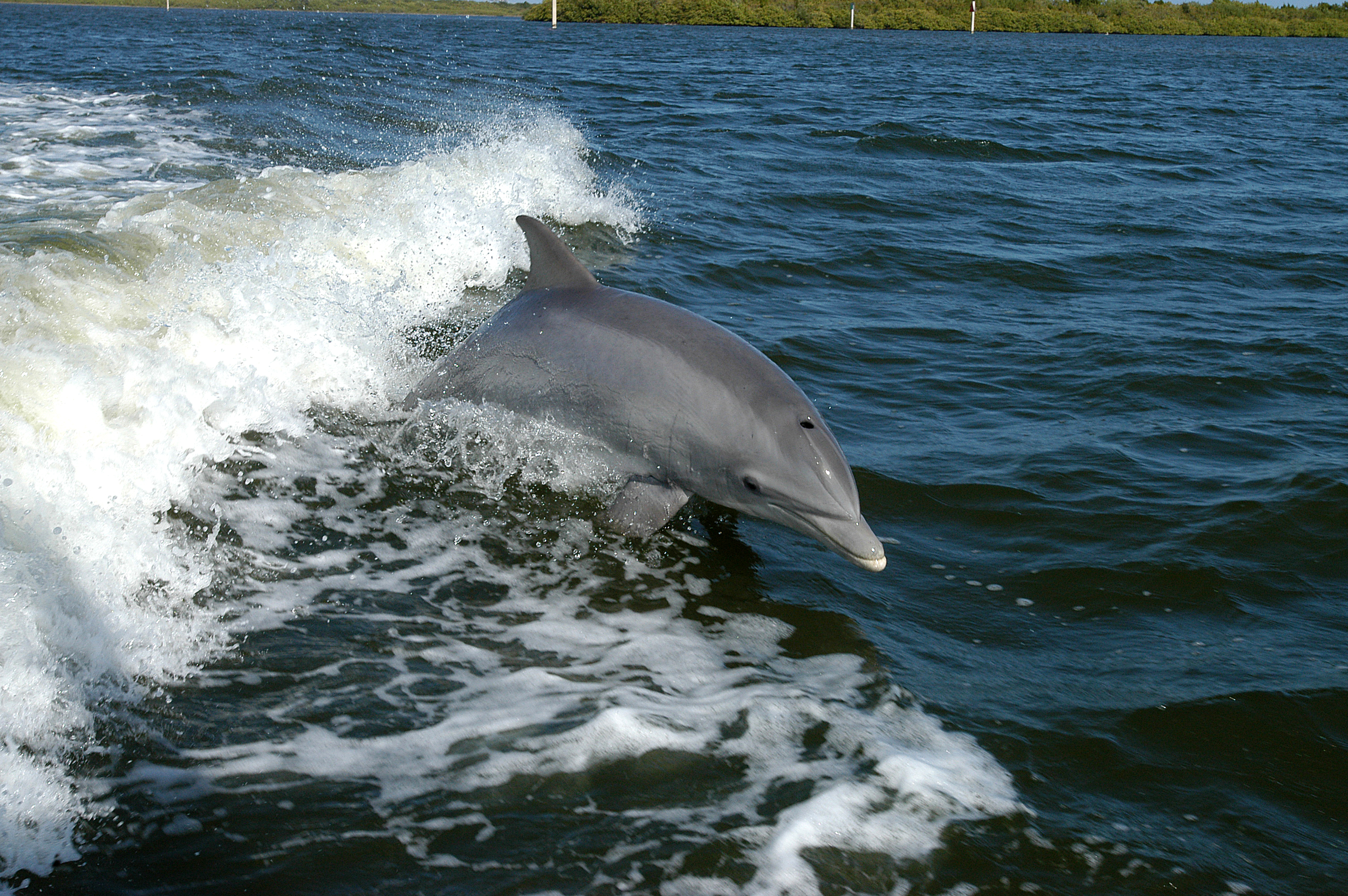
The bottlenose dolphin has the highest encephalization of any animal after humans

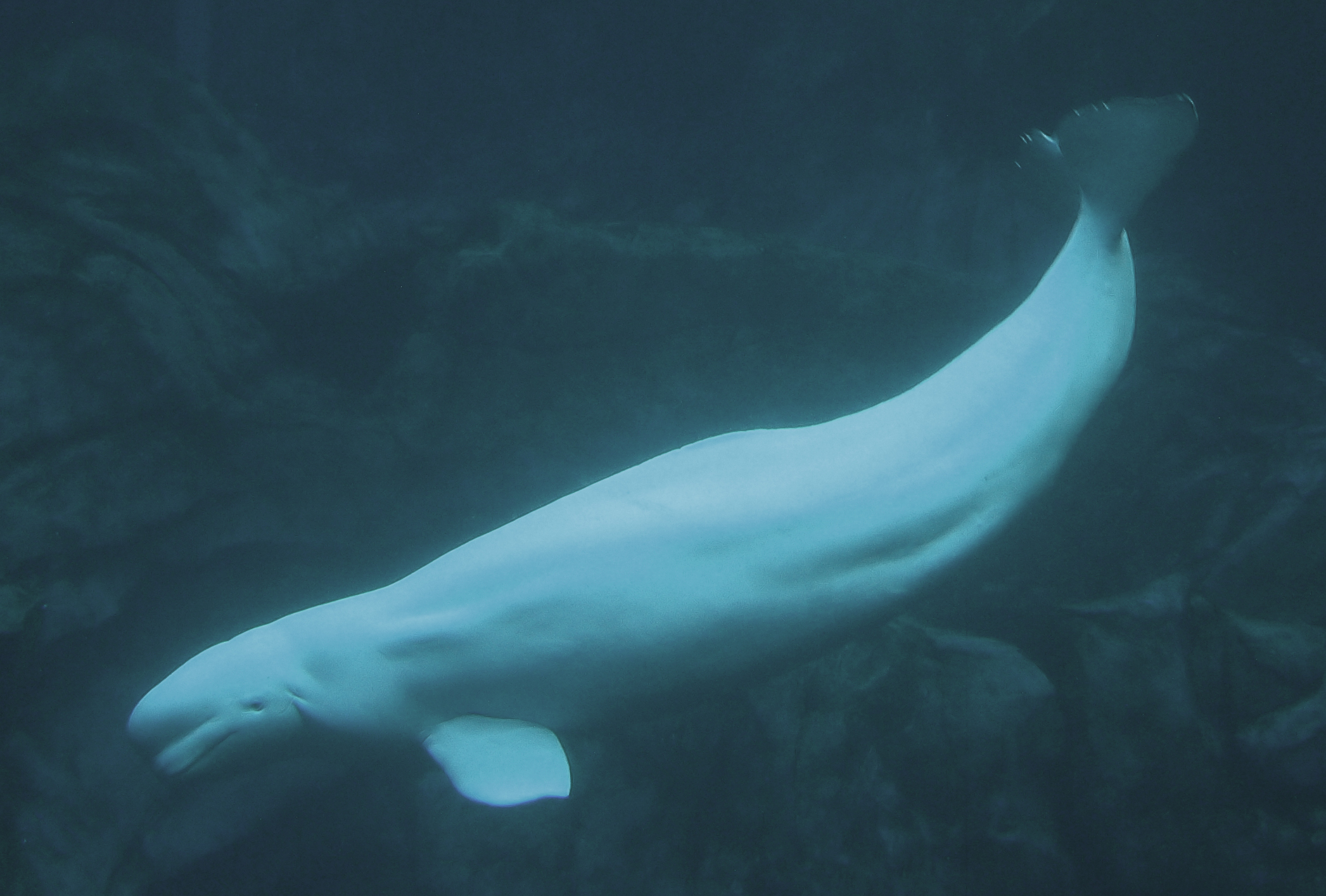
Beluga whale

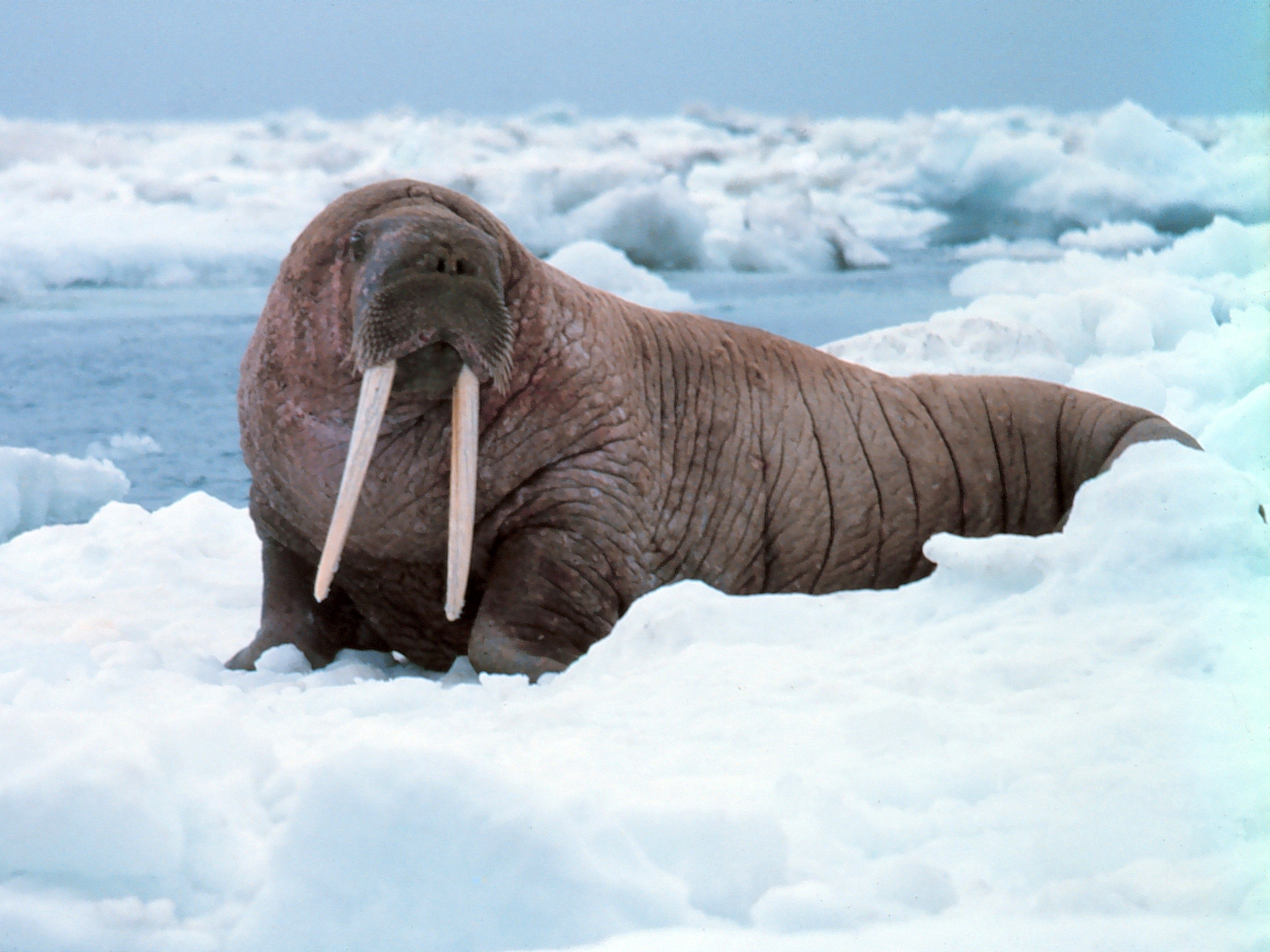
Walrus

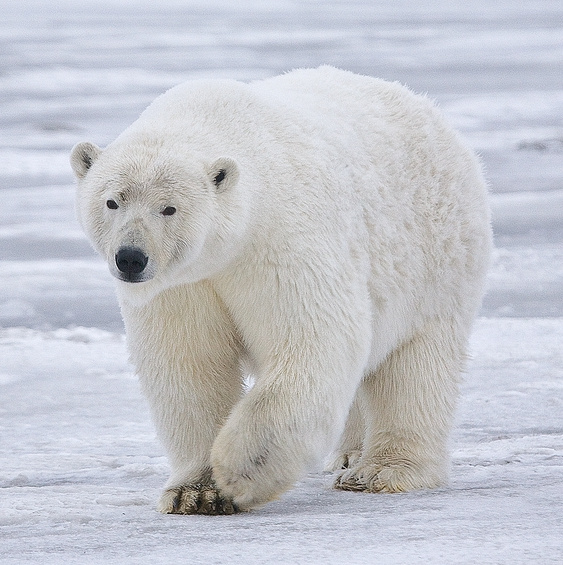
Polar bear

== Primary producers ==
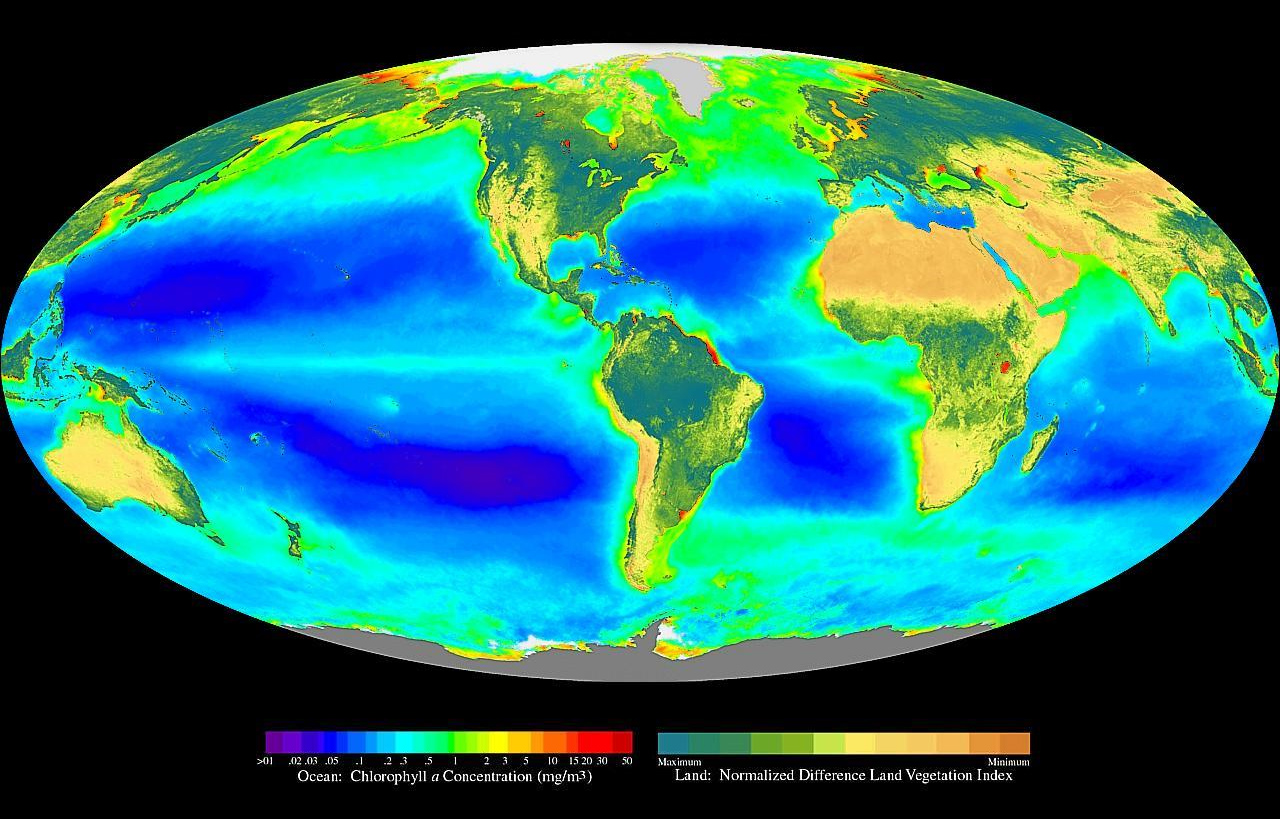
Composite image showing the global distribution of photosynthesis, including both oceanic phytoplankton and terrestrial vegetation. Dark red and blue-green indicate regions of high photosynthetic activity in the ocean and on land, respectively.

Primary producers are the autotroph organisms that make their own food instead of eating other organisms. This means primary producers become the starting point in the food chain for heterotroph organisms that do eat other organisms. Some marine primary producers are specialised bacteria and archaea which are chemotrophs, making their own food by gathering around hydrothermal vents and cold seeps and using chemosynthesis. However most marine primary production comes from organisms which use photosynthesis on the carbon dioxide dissolved in the water. This process uses energy from sunlight to convert water and carbon dioxide into sugars that can be used both as a source of chemical energy and of organic molecules that are used in the structural components of cells. Marine primary producers are important because they underpin almost all marine animal life by generating most of the oxygen and food that provide other organisms with the chemical energy they need to exist.

The principal marine primary producers are cyanobacteria, algae and marine plants. The oxygen released as a by-product of photosynthesis is needed by nearly all living things to carry out cellular respiration. In addition, primary producers are influential in the global carbon and water cycles. They stabilize coastal areas and can provide habitats for marine animals. The term division has been traditionally used instead of phylum when discussing primary producers, but the International Code of Nomenclature for algae, fungi, and plants now accepts both terms as equivalents.

=== Cyanobacteria ===
Cyanobacteria

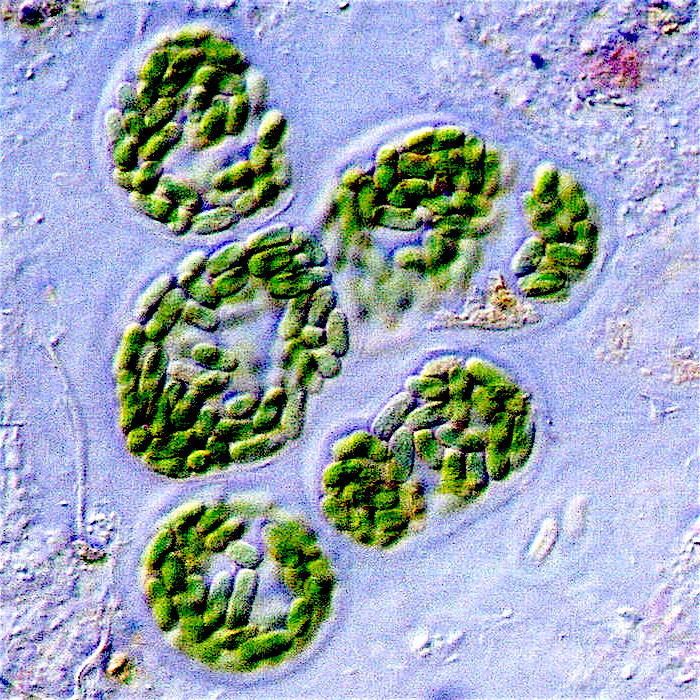
Cyanobacteria from a microbial mat. Cyanobacteria were the first organisms to release oxygen via photosynthesis.

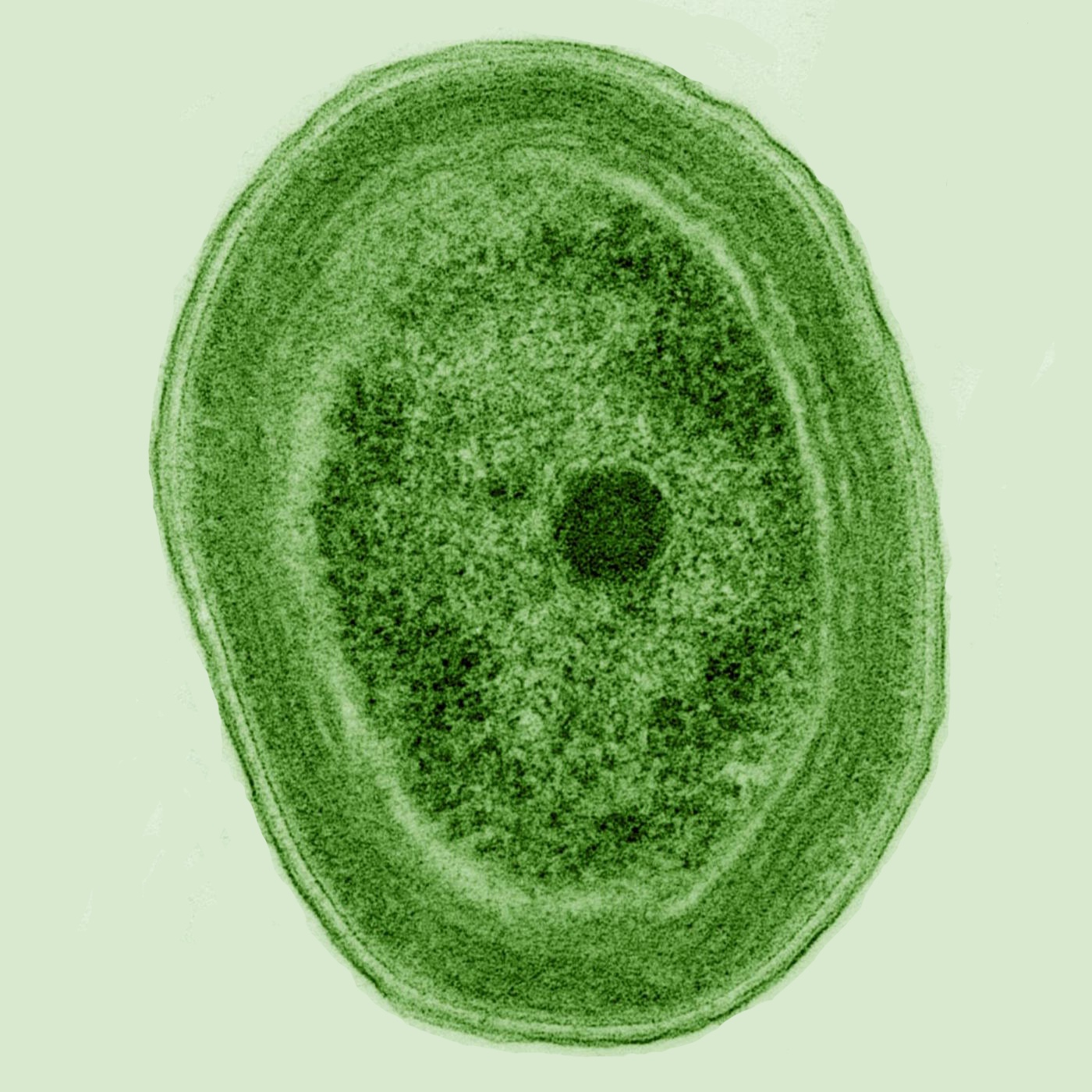
The cyanobacterium genus Prochlorococcus is a major contributor to atmospheric oxygen.

Cyanobacteria were the first organisms to evolve an ability to turn sunlight into chemical energy. They form a phylum (division) of bacteria which range from unicellular to filamentous and include colonial species. They are found almost everywhere on earth: in damp soil, in both freshwater and marine environments, and even on Antarctic rocks. In particular, some species occur as drifting cells floating in the ocean, and as such were amongst the first of the phytoplankton.

The first primary producers that used photosynthesis were oceanic cyanobacteria about 2.3 billion years ago. The release of molecular oxygen by cyanobacteria as a by-product of photosynthesis induced global changes in the Earth's environment. Because oxygen was toxic to most life on Earth at the time, this led to the near-extinction of oxygen-intolerant organisms, a dramatic change which redirected the evolution of the major animal and plant species.

The tiny marine cyanobacterium Prochlorococcus, discovered in 1986, is an important part of the ocean food chain and accounts for much of the photosynthesis of the open ocean, as well as an estimated 20% of the oxygen in the Earth's atmosphere. It is possibly the most plentiful genus on Earth: a single millilitre of surface seawater may contain 100,000 cells or more.

Originally, biologists classified cyanobacteria as algae, and referred to it as "blue-green algae". The more recent view is that cyanobacteria are bacteria, and hence are not even in the same Kingdom as algae. Most authorities today exclude all prokaryotes, and hence cyanobacteria from the definition of algae.

=== Algae ===
Diatoms

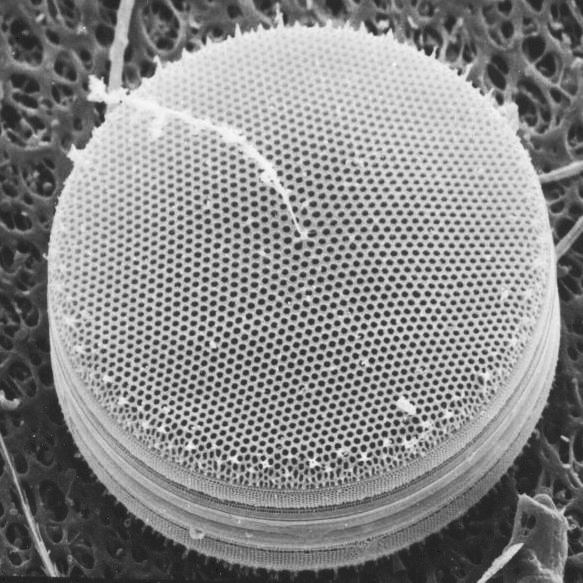
Centric

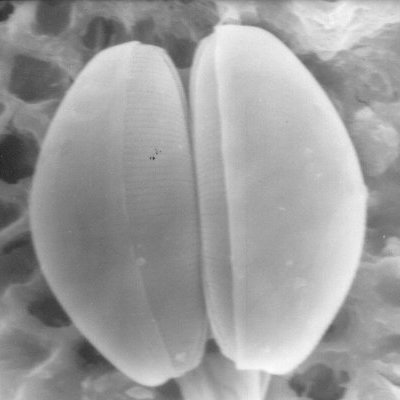
Pennate

Diatoms have a silica shell (frustule) with radial (centric) or bilateral (pennate) symmetry.
Dinoflagellates

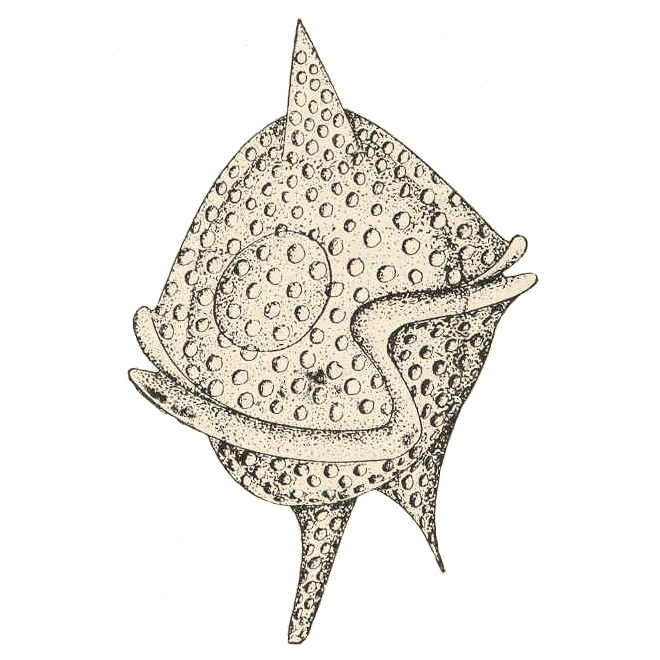
Armoured

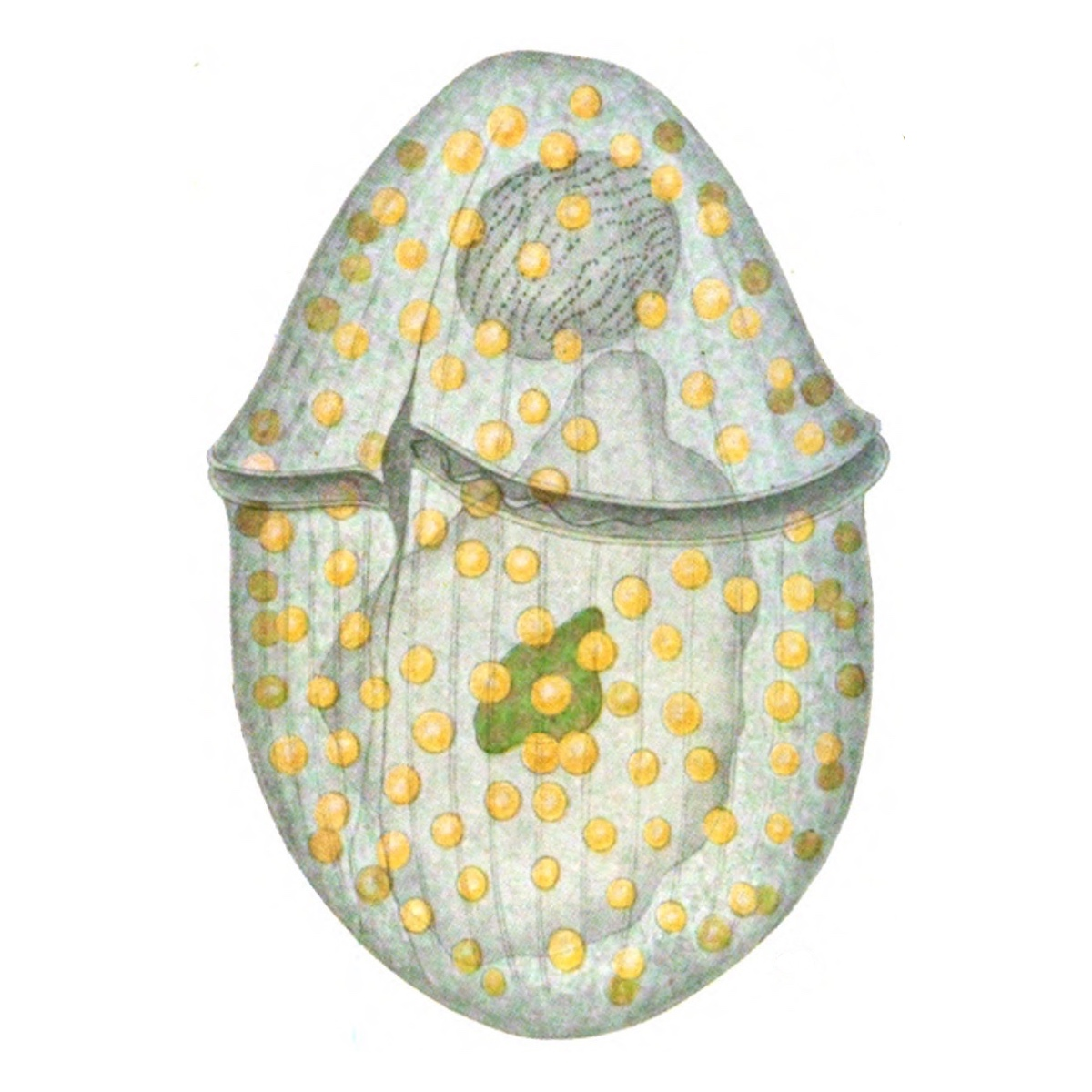
Unarmoured

Traditionally dinoflagellates have been presented as armoured or unarmoured.

Algae is an informal term for a widespread and diverse group of photosynthetic protists which are not necessarily closely related and are thus polyphyletic. Marine algae can be divided into six groups:

- green algae, an informal group containing about 8,000 recognised species. Many species live most of their lives as single cells or are filamentous, while others form colonies made up from long chains of cells, or are highly differentiated macroscopic seaweeds.
- red algae, a (disputed) phylum containing about 7,000 recognised species, mostly multicellular and including many notable seaweeds.
- brown algae, a class containing about 2,000 recognised species, mostly multicellular and including many seaweeds, including kelp
- diatoms, a (disputed) phylum containing about 100,000 recognised species of mainly unicellular algae. Diatoms generate about 20 percent of the oxygen produced on the planet each year, take in over 6.7 billion metric tons of silicon each year from the waters in which they live, and contribute nearly half of the organic material found in the oceans. The shells (frustules) of dead diatoms can reach as much as half a mile deep on the ocean floor.
- dinoflagellates, a phylum of unicellular flagellates with about 2,000 marine species. Many dinoflagellates are known to be photosynthetic, but a large fraction of these are in fact mixotrophic, combining photosynthesis with ingestion of prey (phagotrophy). Some species are endosymbionts of marine animals and play an important part in the biology of coral reefs. Others predate other protozoa, and a few forms are parasitic.
- euglenophytes, a phylum of unicellular flagellates with only a few marine members

Unlike higher plants, algae lack roots, stems, or leaves. They can be classified by size as microalgae or macroalgae.

Microalgae are the microscopic types of algae, not visible to the naked eye. They are mostly unicellular species which exist as individuals or in chains or groups, though some are multicellular. Microalgae are important components of the marine protists (discussed above), as well as the phytoplankton (discussed below). They are very diverse. It has been estimated there are 200,000-800,000 species of which about 50,000 species have been described. Depending on the species, their sizes range from a few micrometers (μm) to a few hundred micrometers. They are specially adapted to an environment dominated by viscous forces.

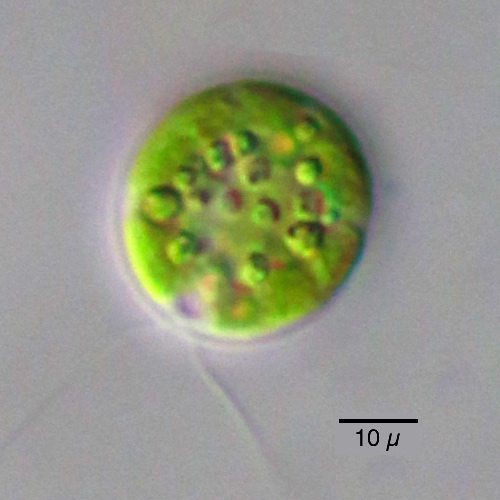
Chlamydomonas globosa, a unicellular green alga with two flagella just visible at bottom left

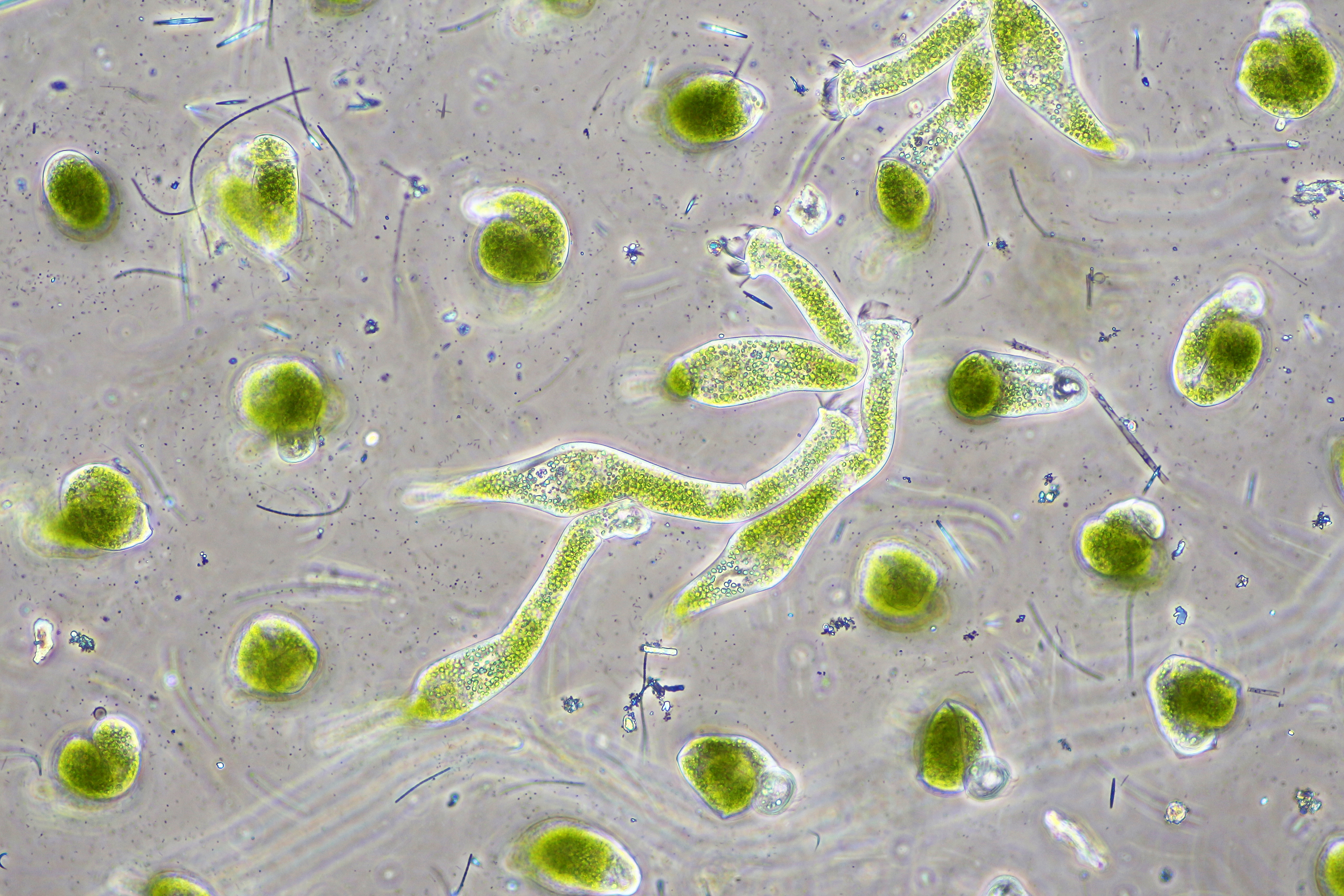
Chlorella vulgaris, a common green microalgae, in endosymbiosis with a ciliate

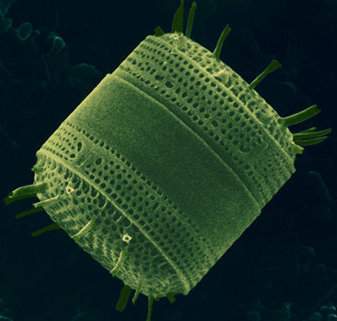
Centric diatom

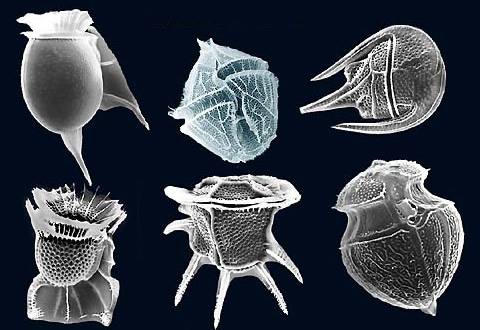
Dinoflagellates

Macroalgae are the larger, multicellular and more visible types of algae, commonly called seaweeds. Seaweeds usually grow in shallow coastal waters where they are anchored to the seafloor by a holdfast. Seaweed that becomes adrift can wash up on beaches. Kelp is a large brown seaweed that forms large underwater forests covering about 25% of the world coastlines. They are among the most productive and dynamic ecosystems on Earth. Some Sargassum seaweeds are planktonic (free-floating). Like microalgae, macroalgae (seaweeds) are technically marine protists since they are not true plants.

A seaweed is a macroscopic form of red or brown or green algae.

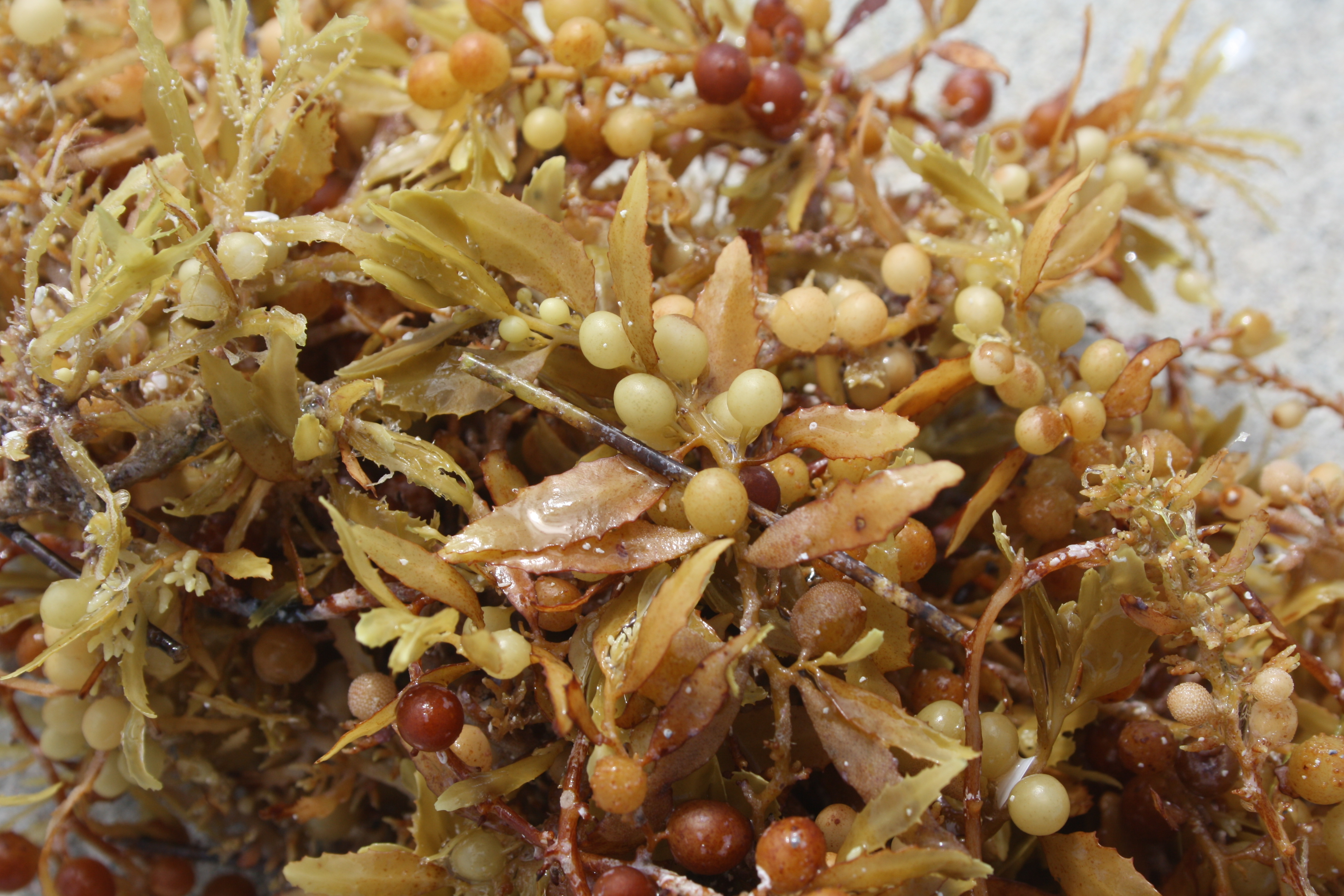
Sargassum seaweed is a planktonic brown alga with air bladders that help it float.

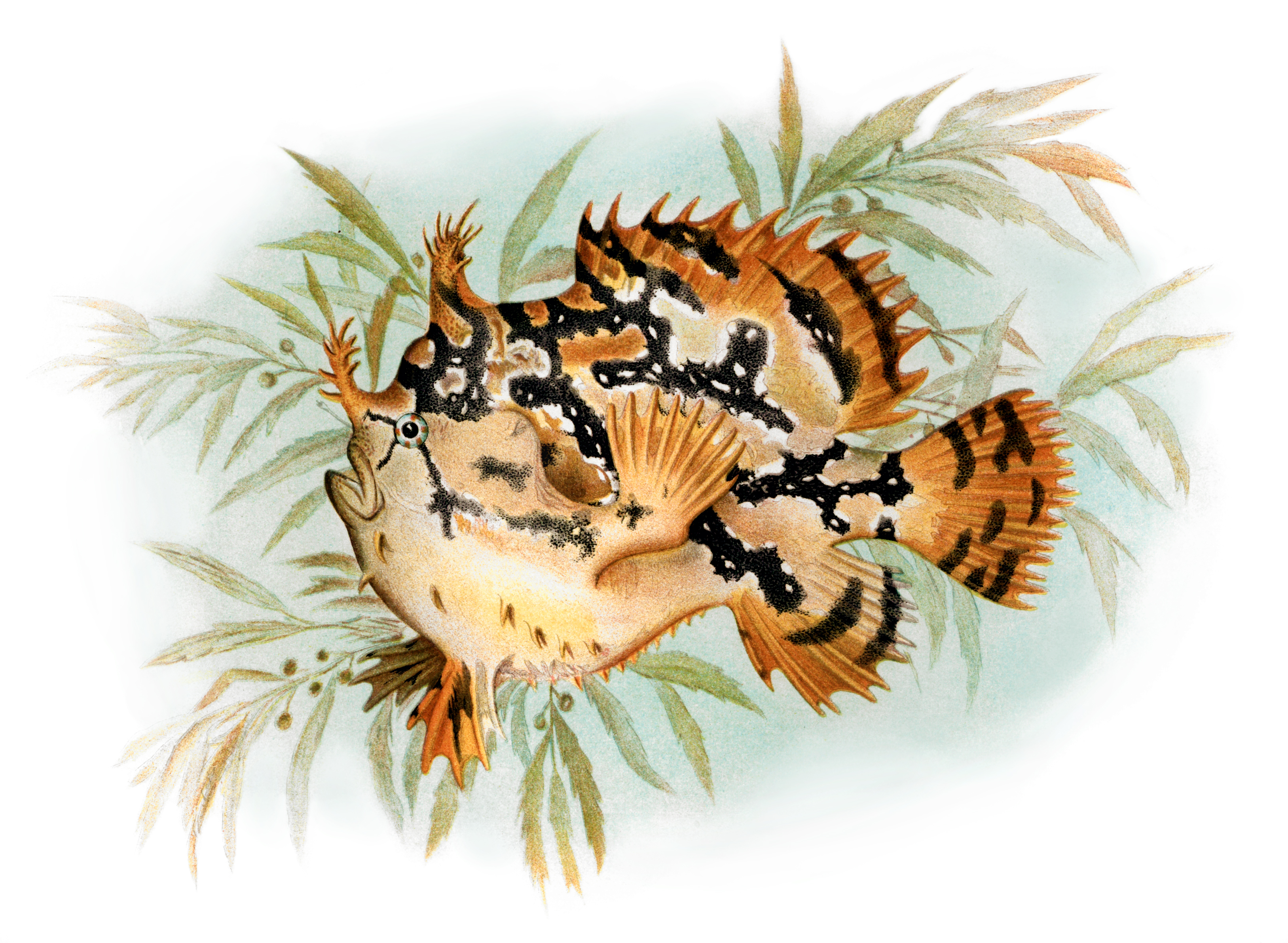
Sargassum fish are camouflaged to live among drifting Sargassum seaweed.

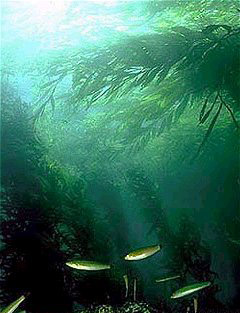
Kelp forests are among the most productive ecosystems on the planet.

Unicellular macroalgae (see also macroscopic protists ←)

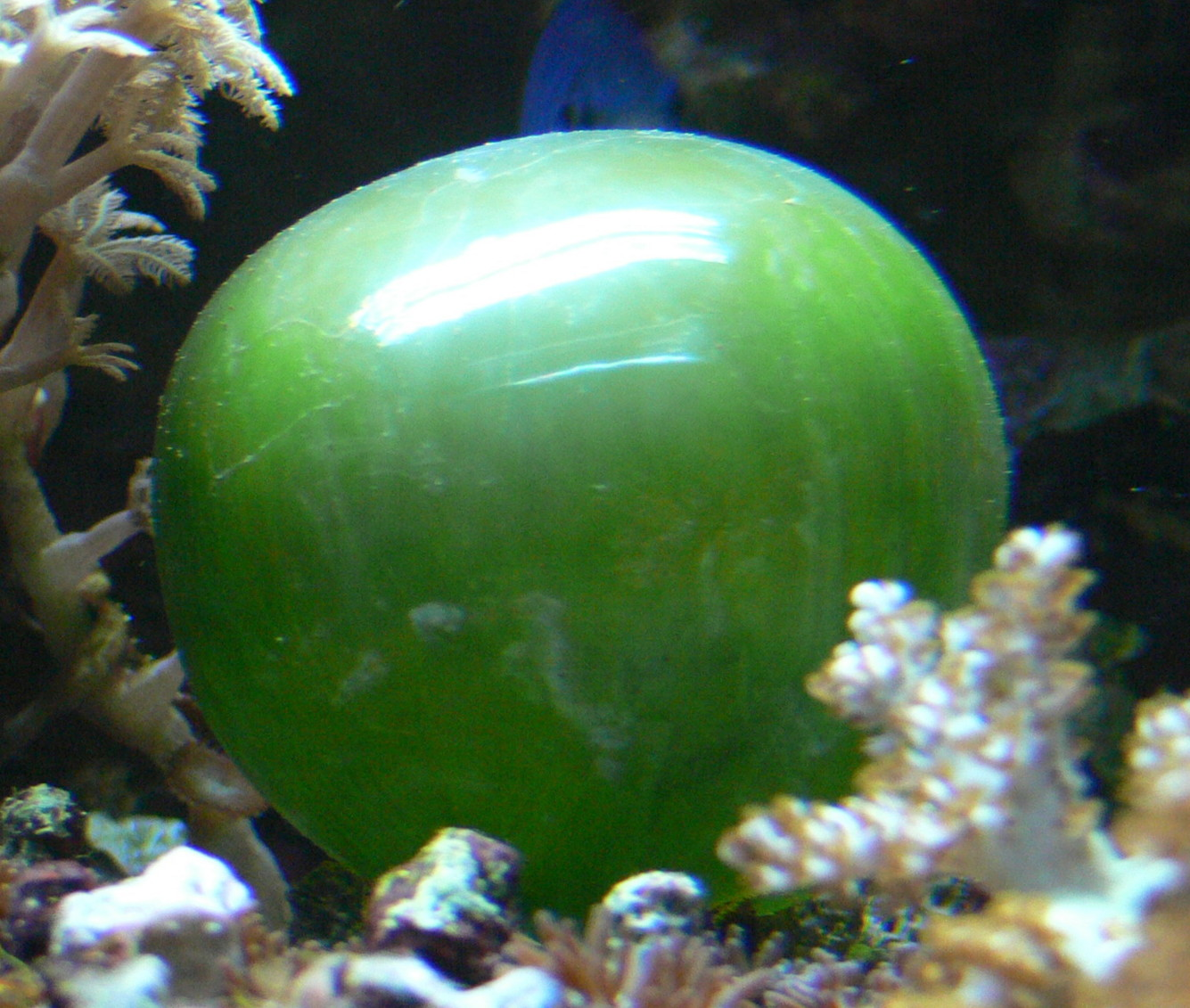
The unicellular bubble algae lives in tidal zones. It can have a 4 cm diameter.

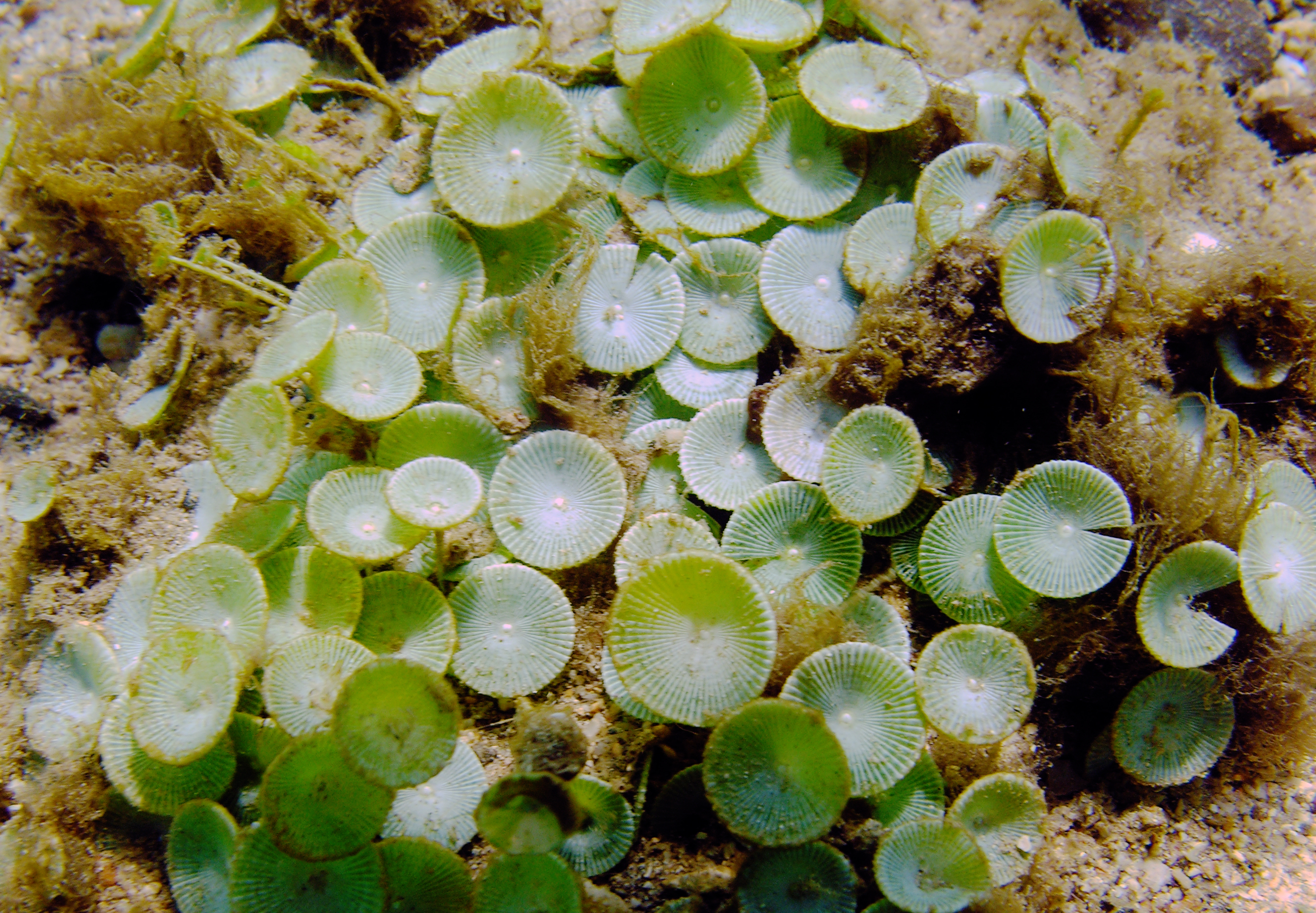
The unicellular mermaid's wineglass are mushroom-shaped algae that grow up to 10 cm high.

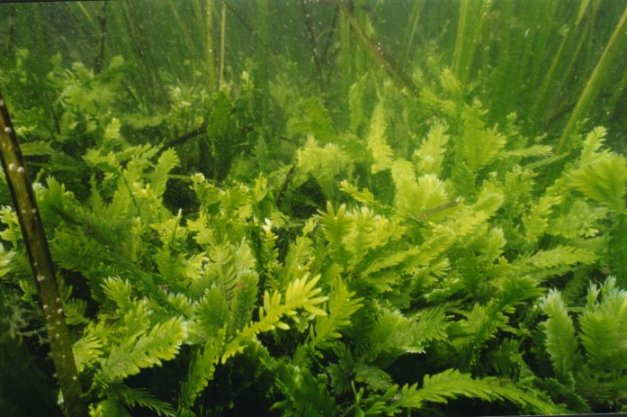
Killer algae are single-celled organisms, but look like ferns and grow stalks up to 80 cm long.

Unicellular organisms are usually microscopic, less than one tenth of a millimeter long. There are exceptions. Mermaid's wineglass, a genus of subtropical green algae, is single-celled but remarkably large and complex in form with a single large nucleus, making it a model organism for studying cell biology. Another single celled algae, Caulerpa taxifolia, has the appearance of a vascular plant including "leaves" arranged neatly up stalks like a fern. Selective breeding in aquariums to produce hardier strains resulted in an accidental release into the Mediterranean where it has become an invasive species known colloquially as killer algae.

=== Origin of plants ===
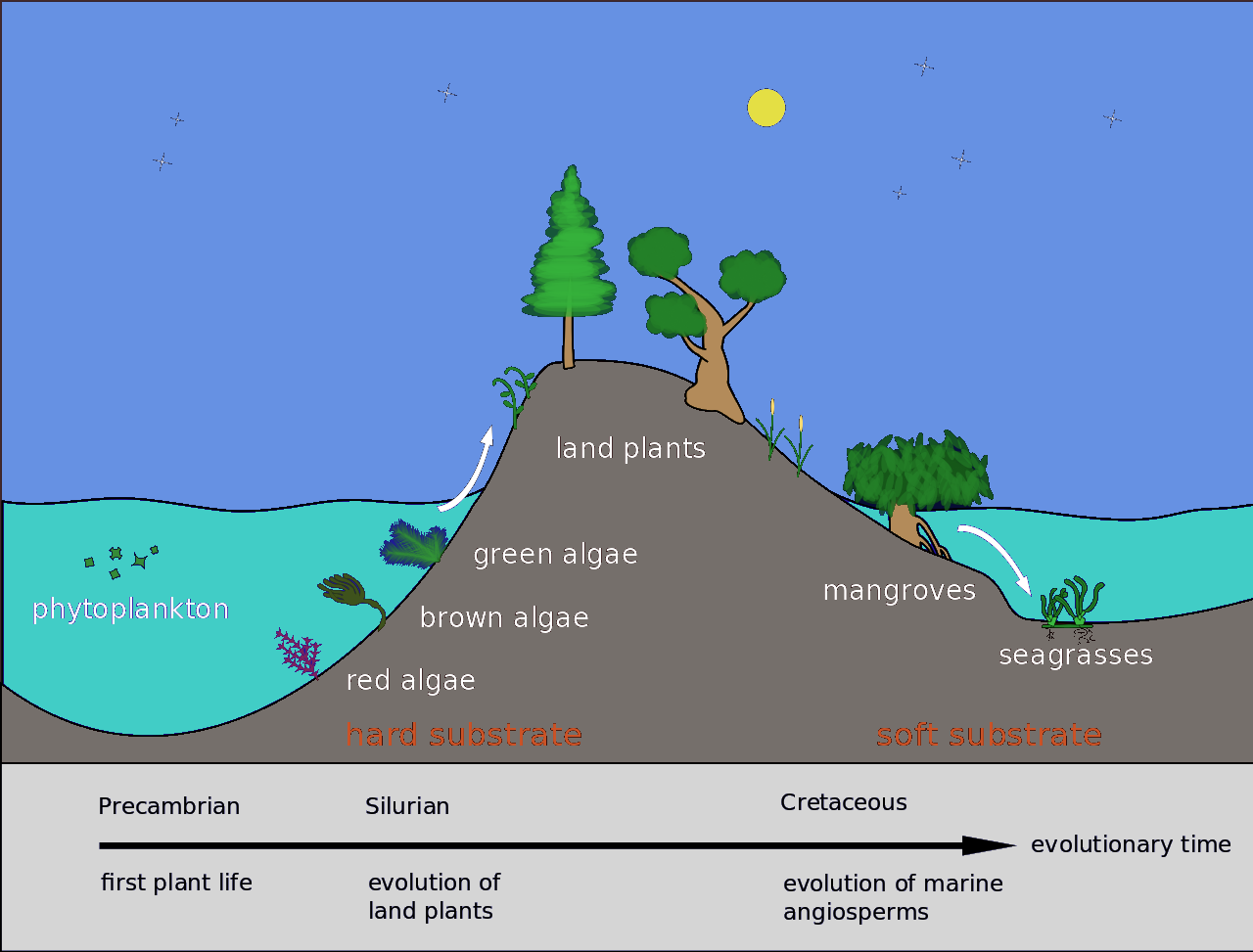
Evolution of mangroves and seagrasses

Back in the Silurian, some phytoplankton evolved into red, brown and green algae. These algae then invaded the land and started evolving into the land plants we know today. Later, in the Cretaceous, some of these land plants returned to the sea as marine plants, such as mangroves and seagrasses.

Marine plants can be found in intertidal zones and shallow waters, such as seagrasses like eelgrass and turtle grass, Thalassia. These plants have adapted to the high salinity of the ocean environment. Plant life can also flourish in the brackish waters of estuaries, where mangroves, cordgrass or beach grass might grow.

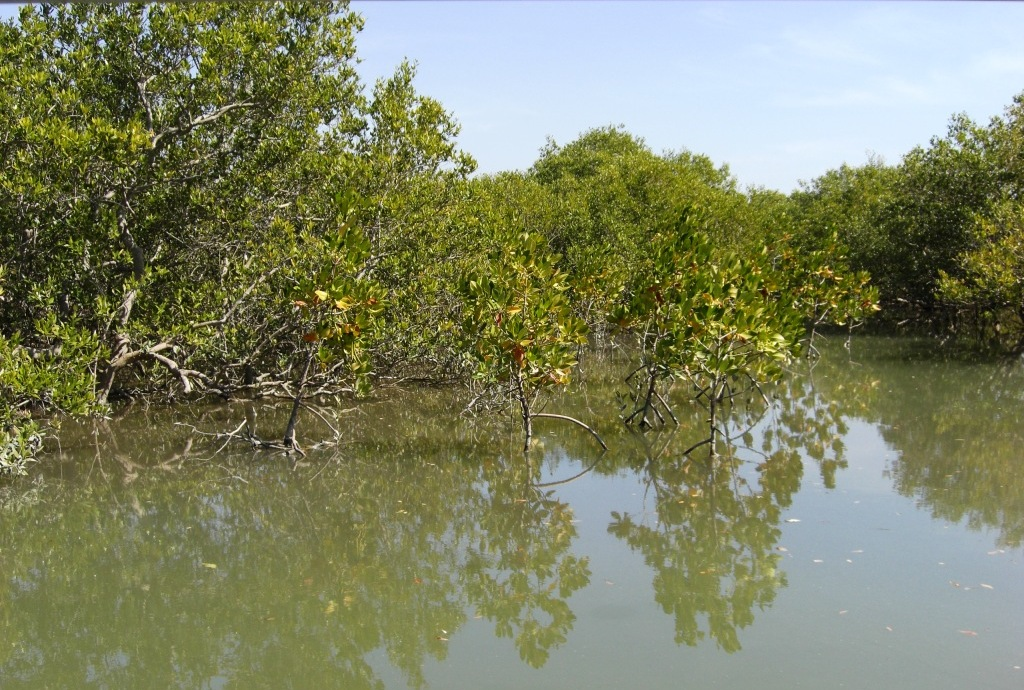
Mangroves

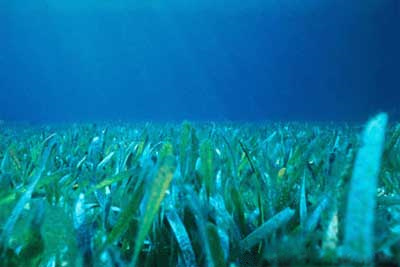
Seagrass meadow

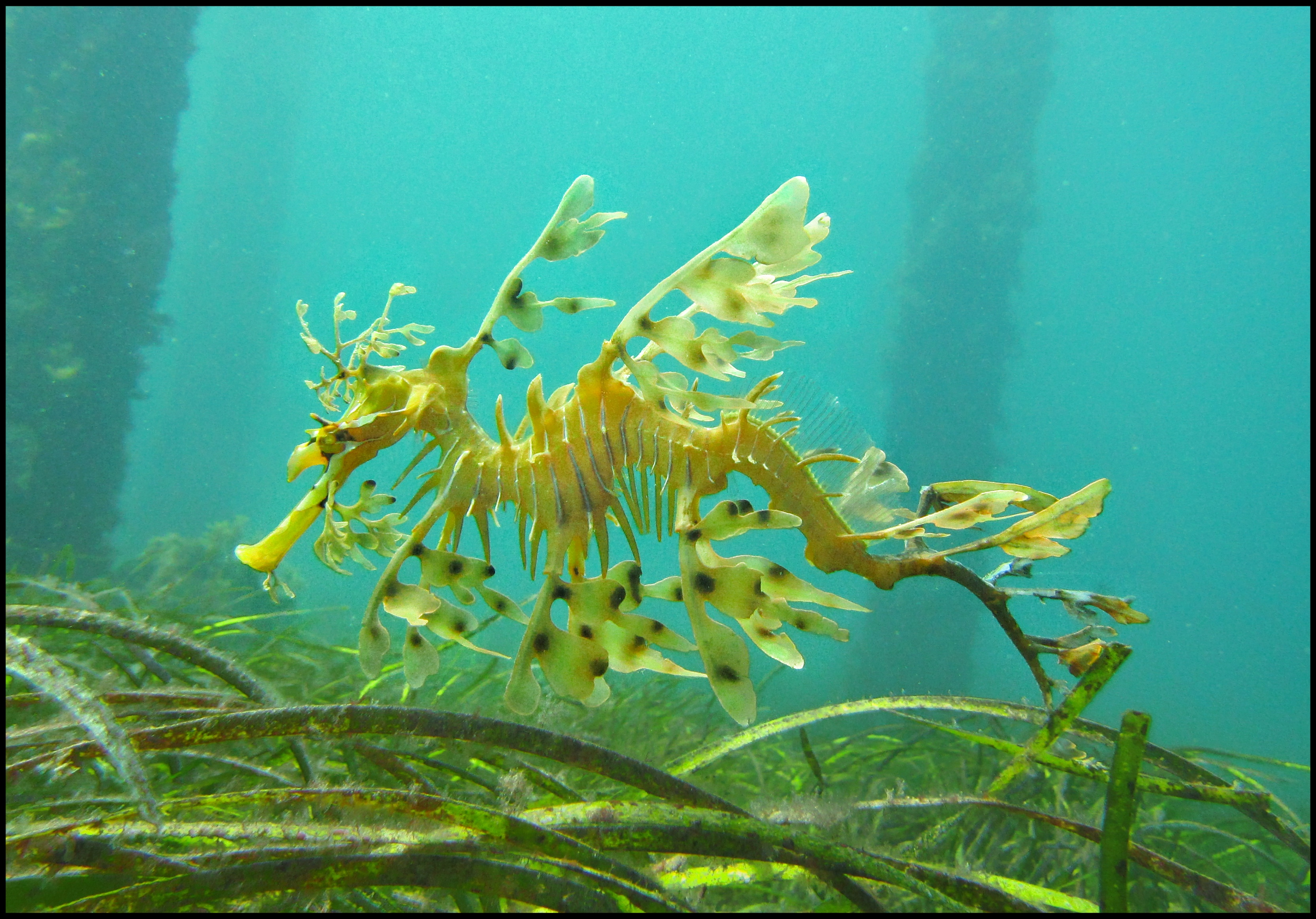
Sea dragons camouflaged to look like floating seaweed live in kelp forests and seagrass meadows.

The total world area of mangrove forests was estimated in 2010 as 134,257 square kilometres (51,837 sq mi) (based on satellite data). The total world area of seagrass meadows is more difficult to determine, but was conservatively estimated in 2003 as 177,000 square kilometres (68,000 sq mi).

Mangroves and seagrasses provide important nursery habitats for marine life, acting as hiding and foraging places for larval and juvenile forms of larger fish and invertebrates.

== Plankton and trophic interactions ==
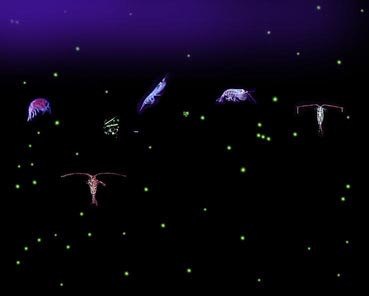
Plankton are drifting or floating organisms that cannot swim against a current, and include organisms from most areas of life: bacteria, archaea, algae, protozoa and animals.

Plankton (from Greek for wanderers) are a diverse group of organisms that live in the water column of large bodies of water but cannot swim against a current. As a result, they wander or drift with the currents. Plankton are defined by their ecological niche, not by any phylogenetic or taxonomic classification. They are a crucial source of food for many marine animals, from forage fish to whales. Plankton can be divided into a plant-like component and an animal component.

=== Phytoplankton ===
Phytoplankton are the plant-like components of the plankton community ("phyto" comes from the Greek for plant). They are autotrophic (self-feeding), meaning that, like plants, they generate their own food and do not need to consume other organisms.

Phytoplankton consist mainly of microscopic photosynthetic eukaryotes which inhabit the upper sunlit layer in all oceans. They need sunlight so they can photosynthesize. Most phytoplankton are single-celled algae, but other phytoplankton are bacteria and some are protists. Phytoplankton groups include cyanobacteria (above), diatoms, various other types of algae (red, green, brown, and yellow-green), dinoflagellates, euglenoids, coccolithophorids, cryptomonads, chrysophytes, chlorophytes, prasinophytes, and silicoflagellates. They form the base of the primary production that drives the ocean food web, and account for half of the current global primary production, more than the terrestrial forests.

Coccolithophores

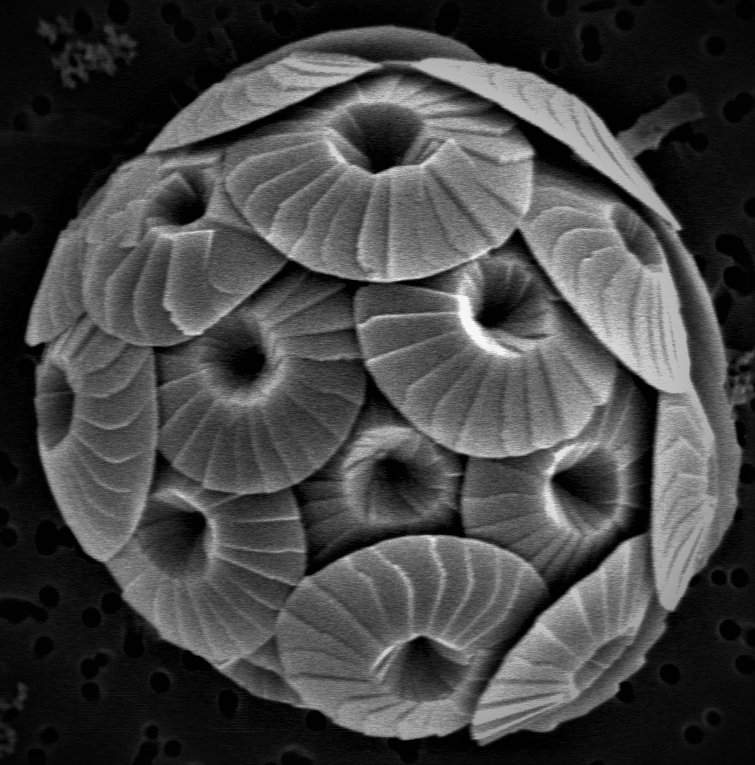
...have plates called coccoliths

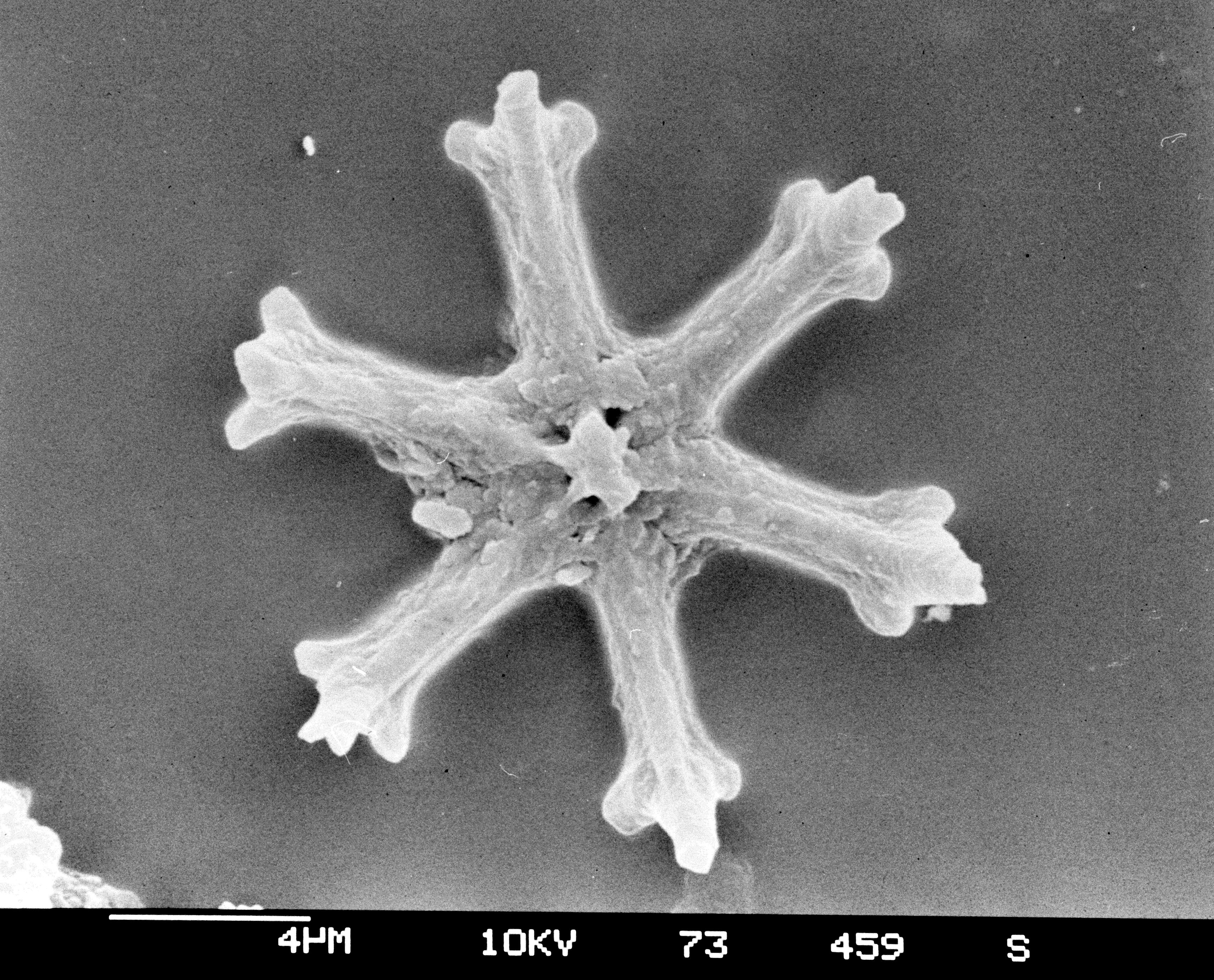
...extinct fossil

Coccolithophores build calcite skeletons important to the marine carbon cycle.
Phytoplankton

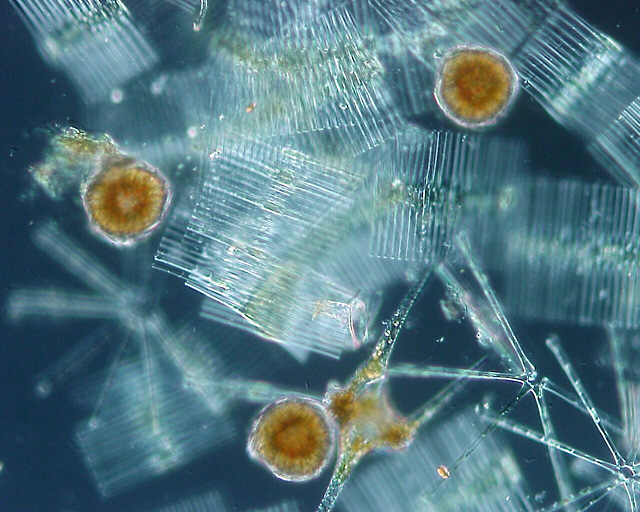
Phytoplankton are the foundation of the ocean food chain.

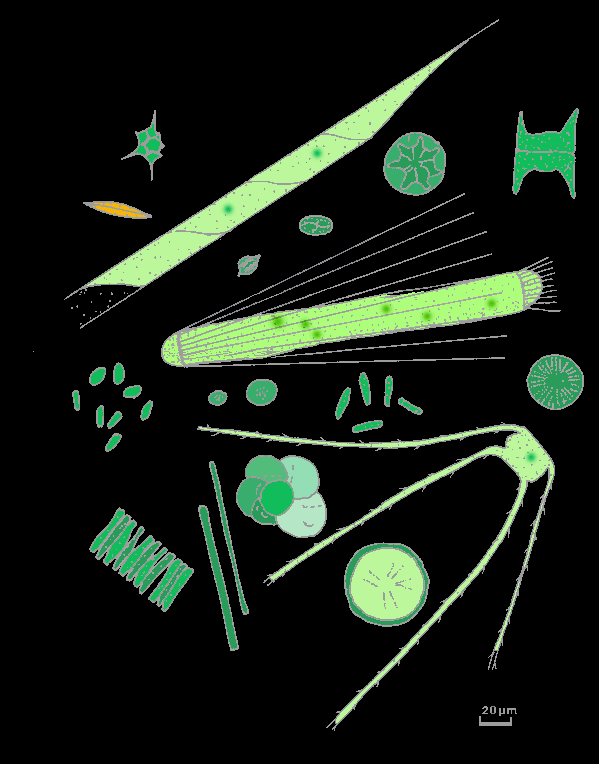
Phytoplankton come in many shapes and sizes.

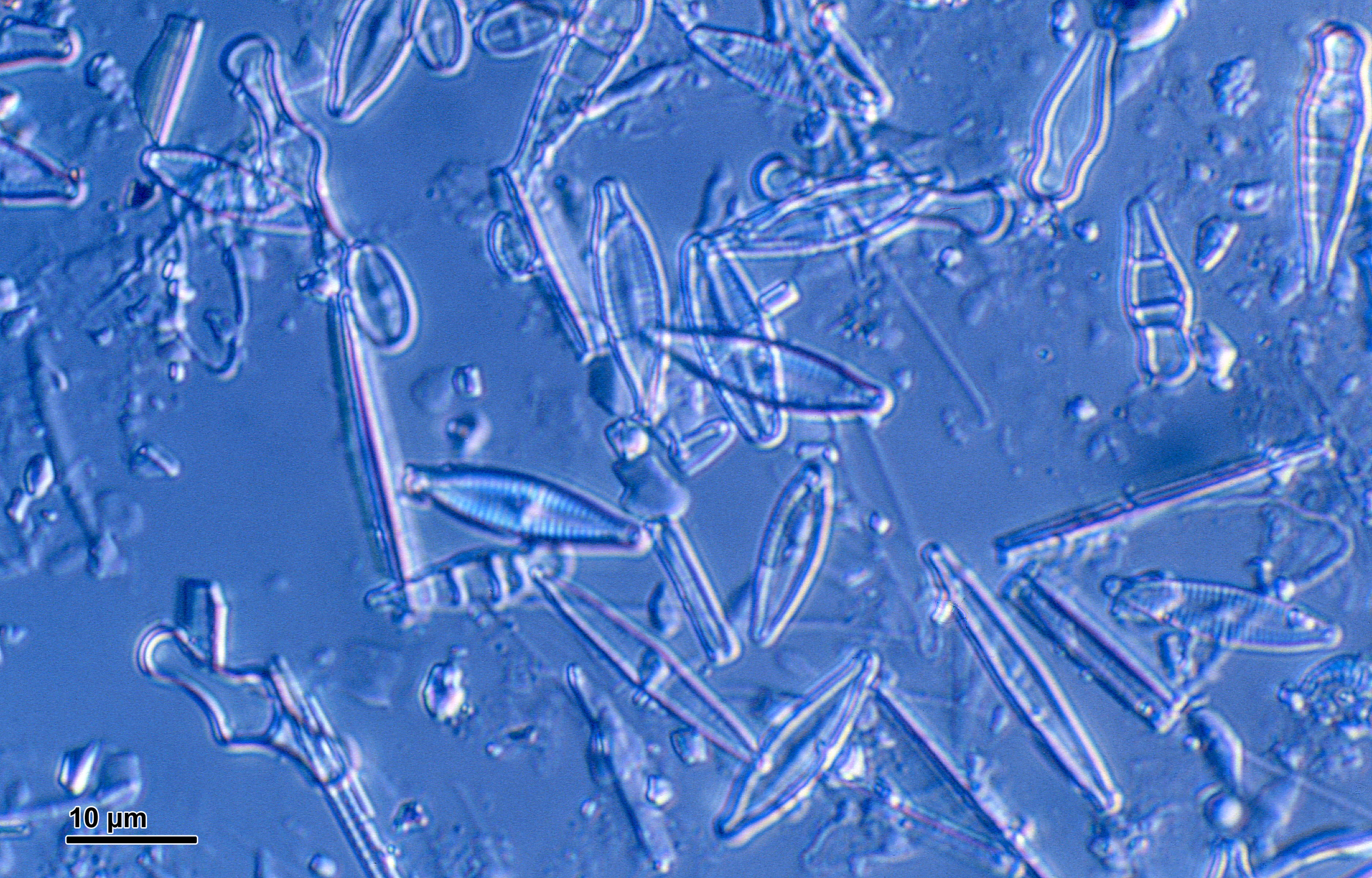
Diatoms are one of the most common types of phytoplankton.
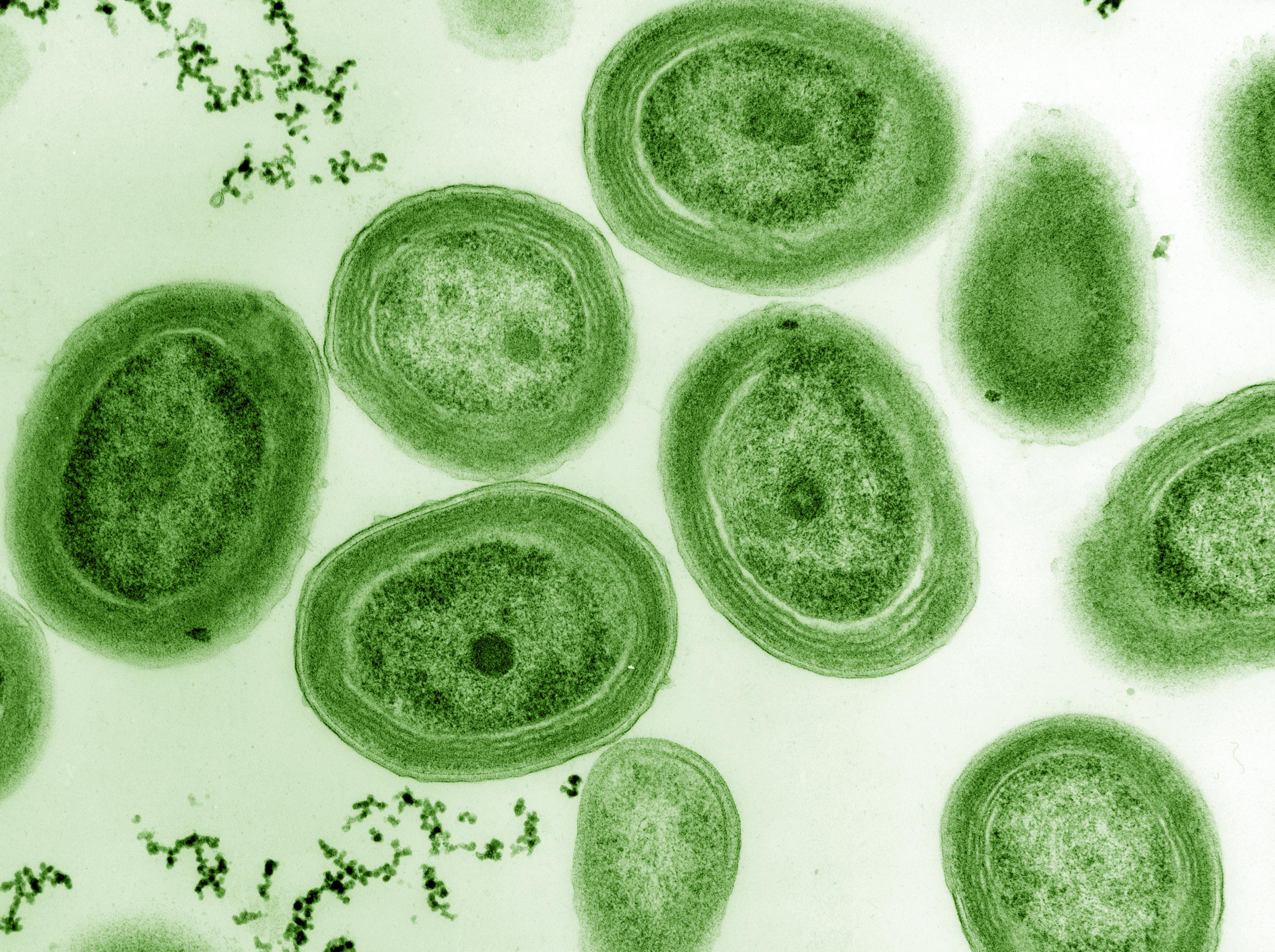
The cyanobacterium Prochlorococcus accounts for much of the ocean's primary production.

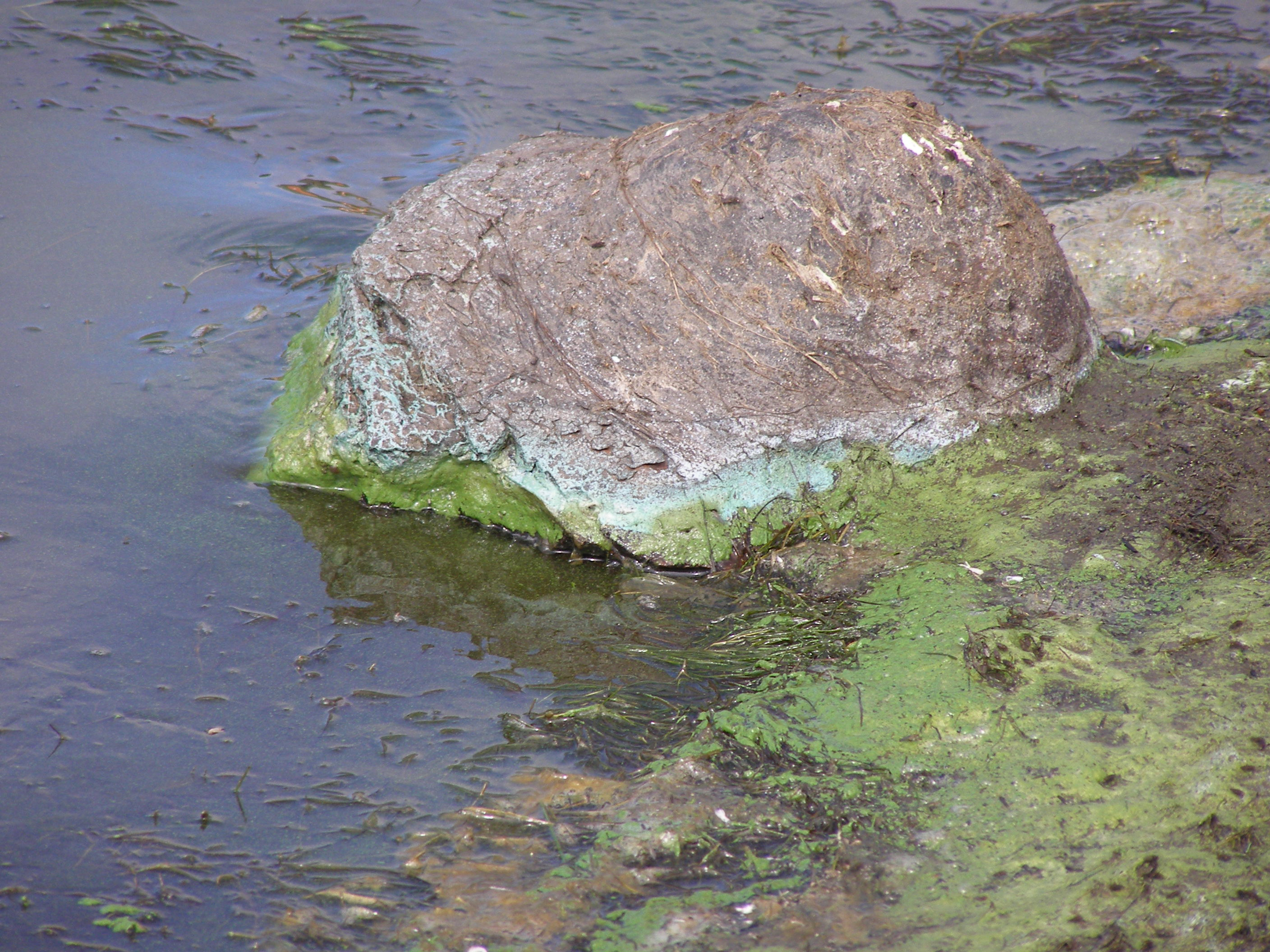
Green cyanobacteria scum washed up on a rock in California

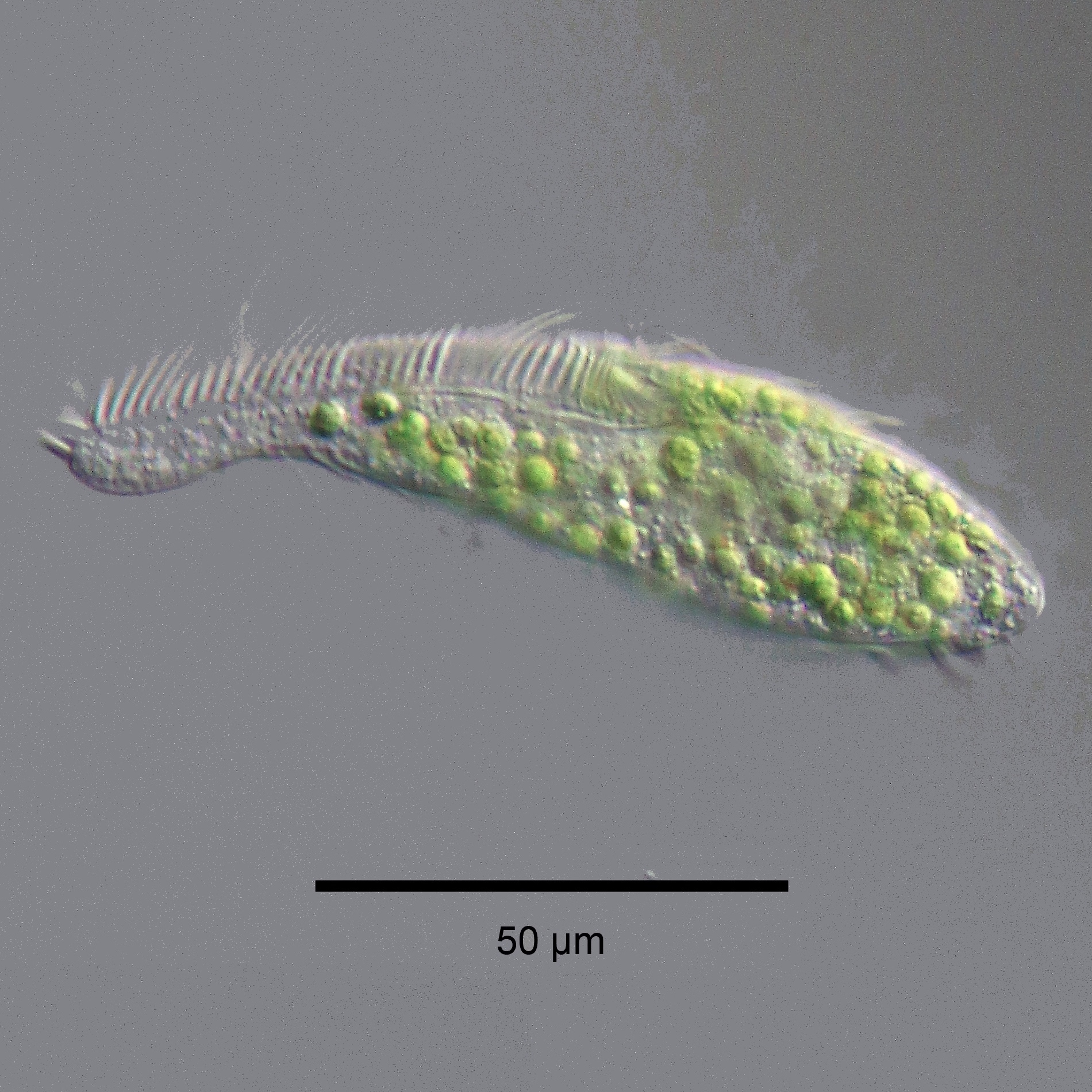
Zoochlorellae (green) living inside the ciliate Stichotricha secunda

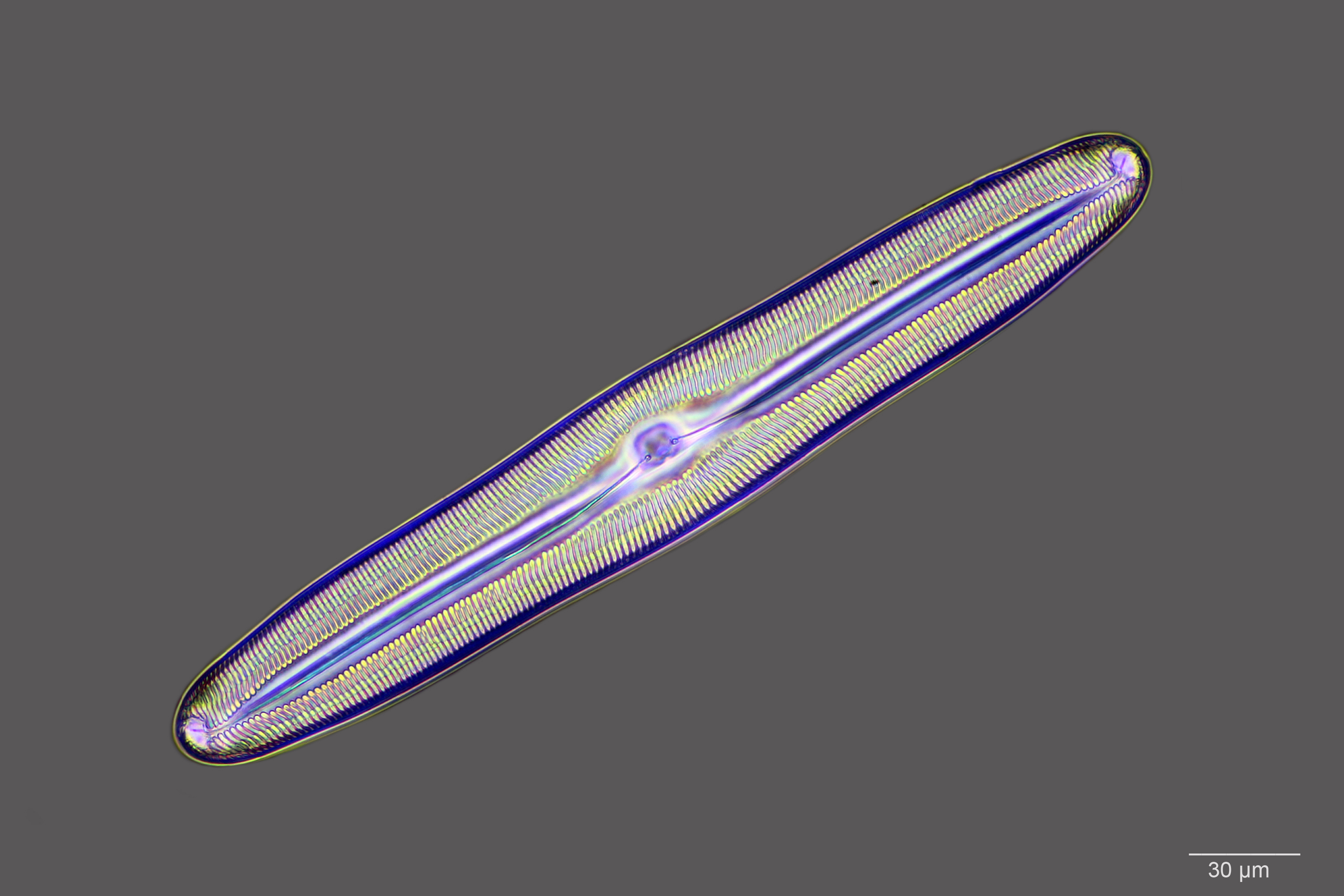
There are over 100,000 species of diatoms which account for 50% of the ocean's primary production.

Red, orange, yellow and green represent areas where algal blooms abound. Blue areas represent nutrient-poor zones where phytoplankton exist in lower concentrations.

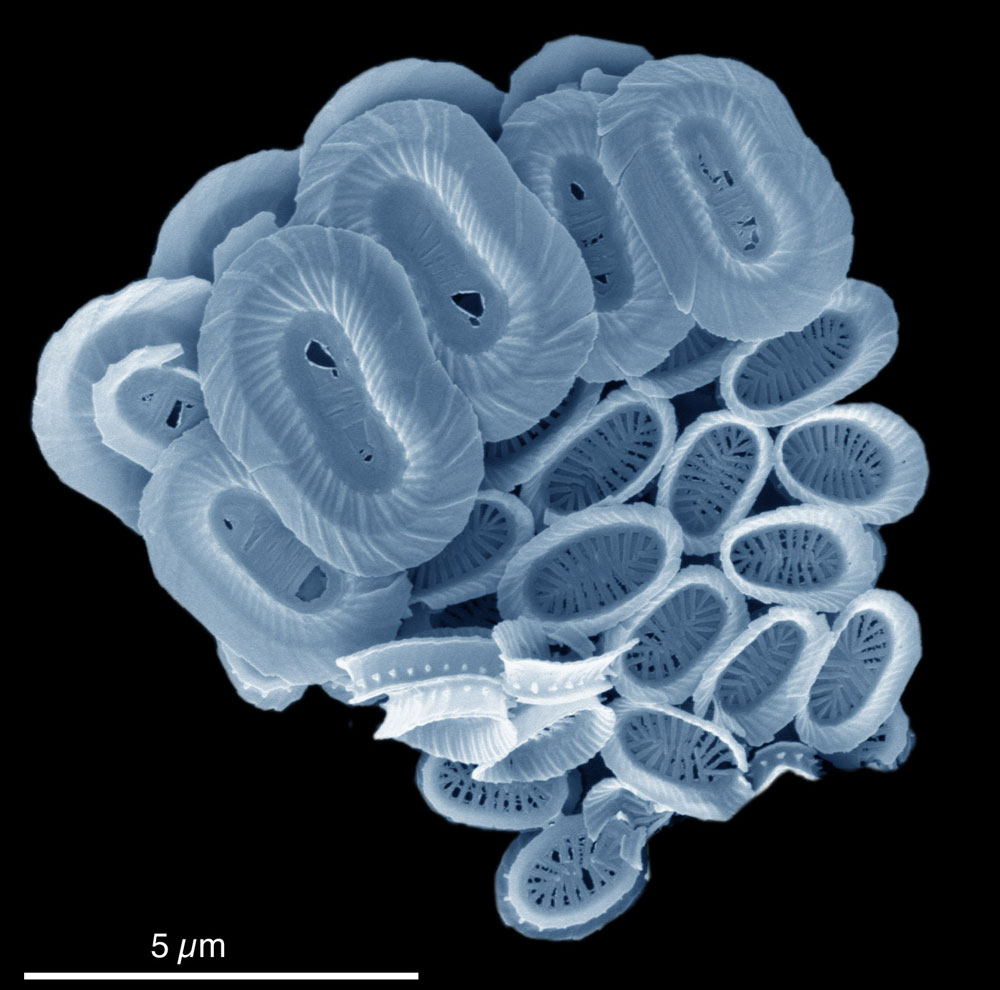
Coccolithophores named after the BBC documentary series. The Blue Planet

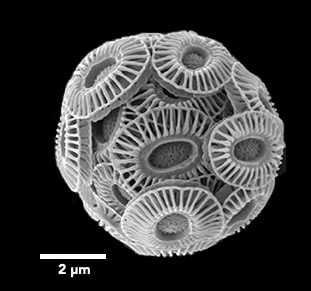
The coccolithophore Emiliania huxleyi

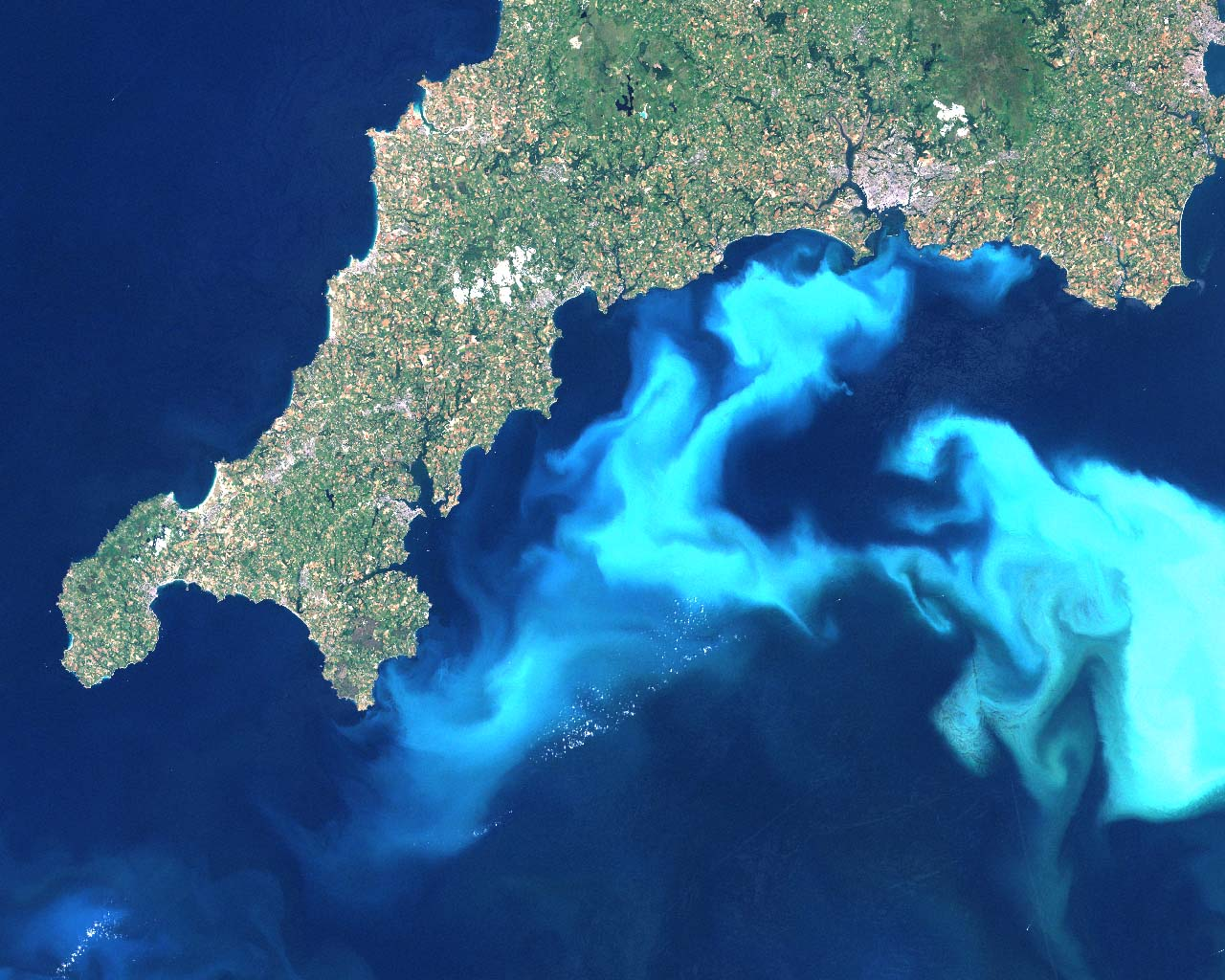
Algae bloom of Emiliania huxleyi off the southern coast of England

=== Zooplankton ===
Radiolarians
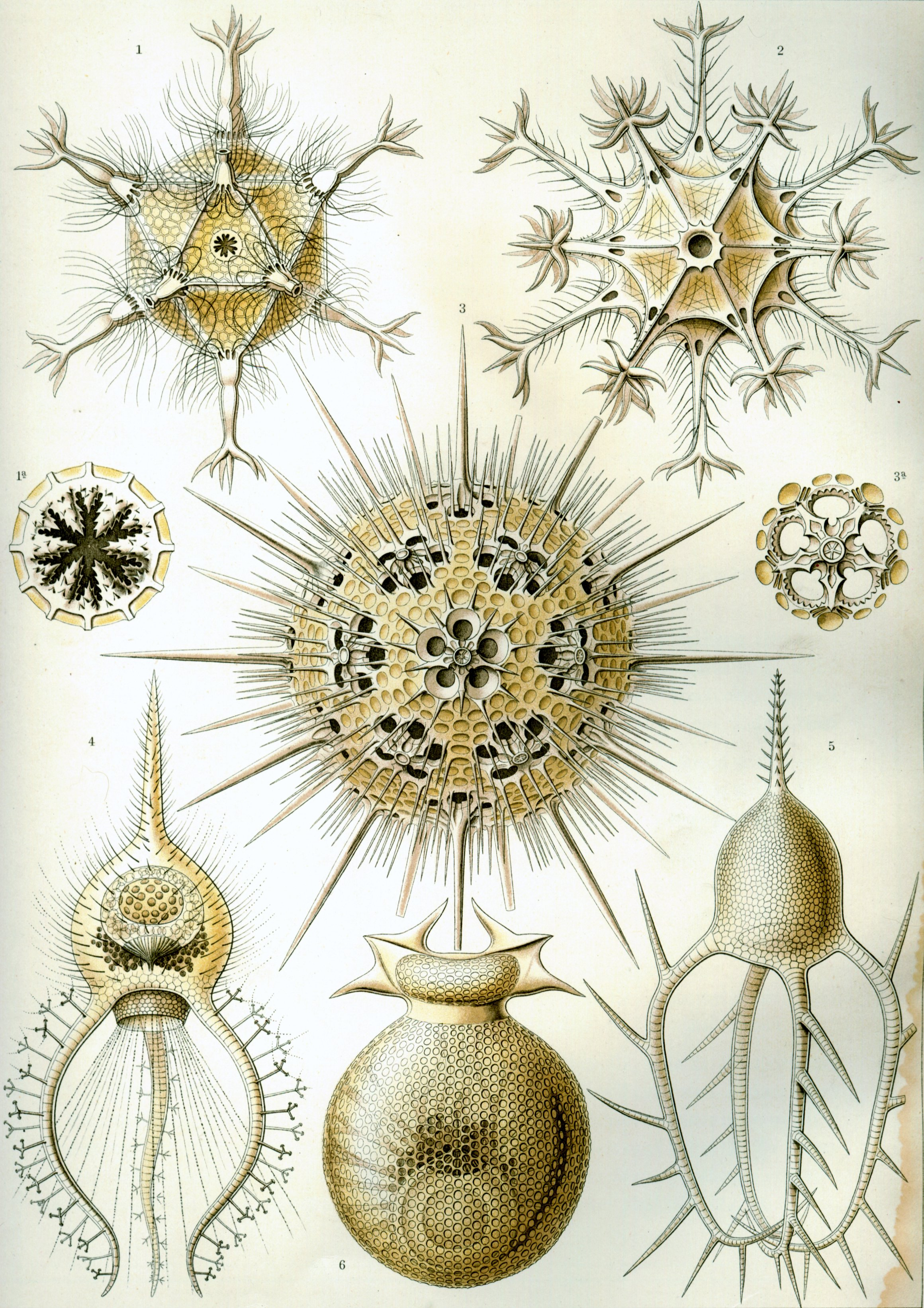
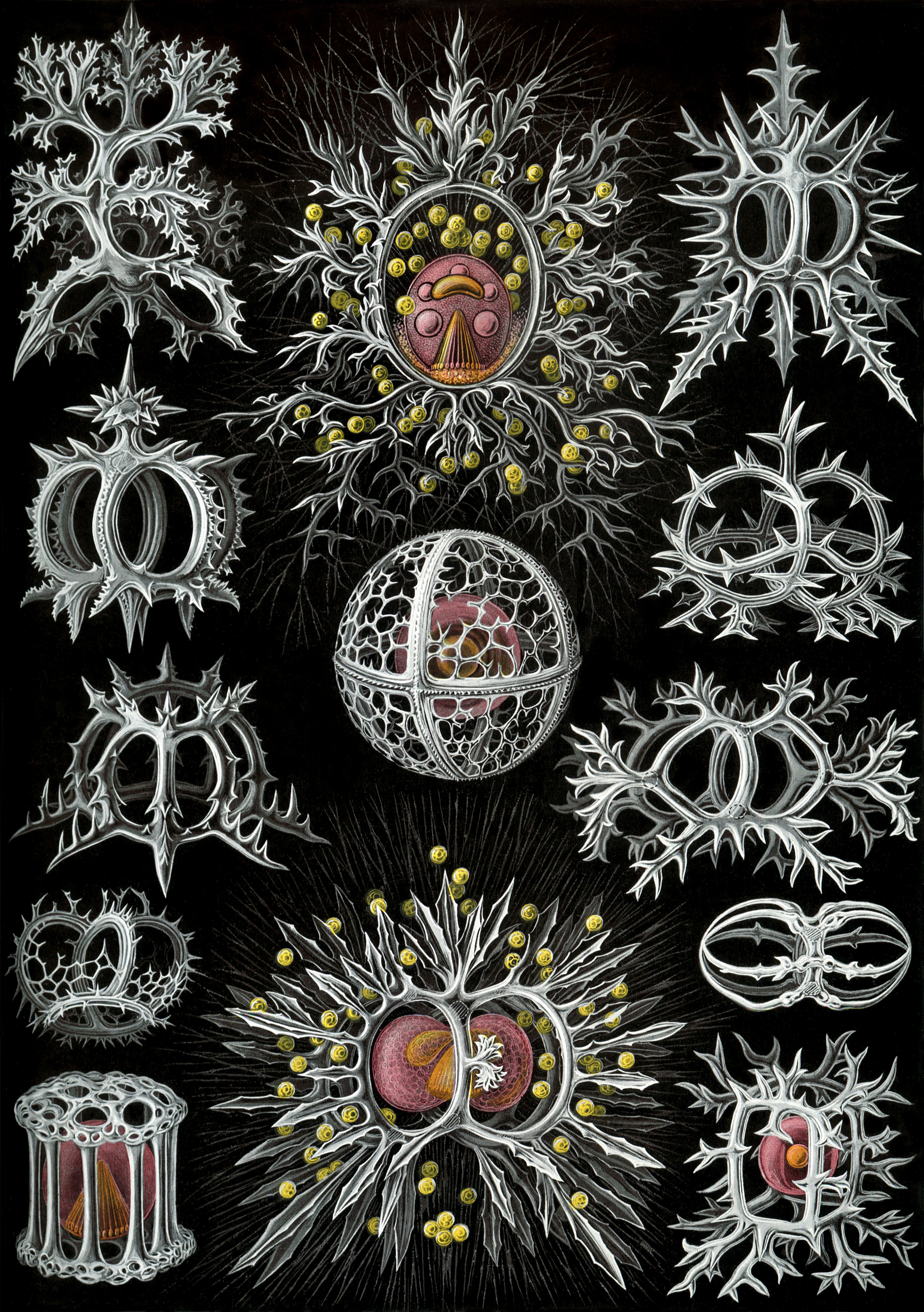
Drawings by Haeckel 1904

Zooplankton are the animal-like component of the planktonic community ("zoo" comes from the Greek for animal). They are heterotrophic (other-feeding), meaning that, like animals, they cannot produce their own food and must consume instead other plants or animals as food. In particular, this means they eat phytoplankton.

Foraminiferans

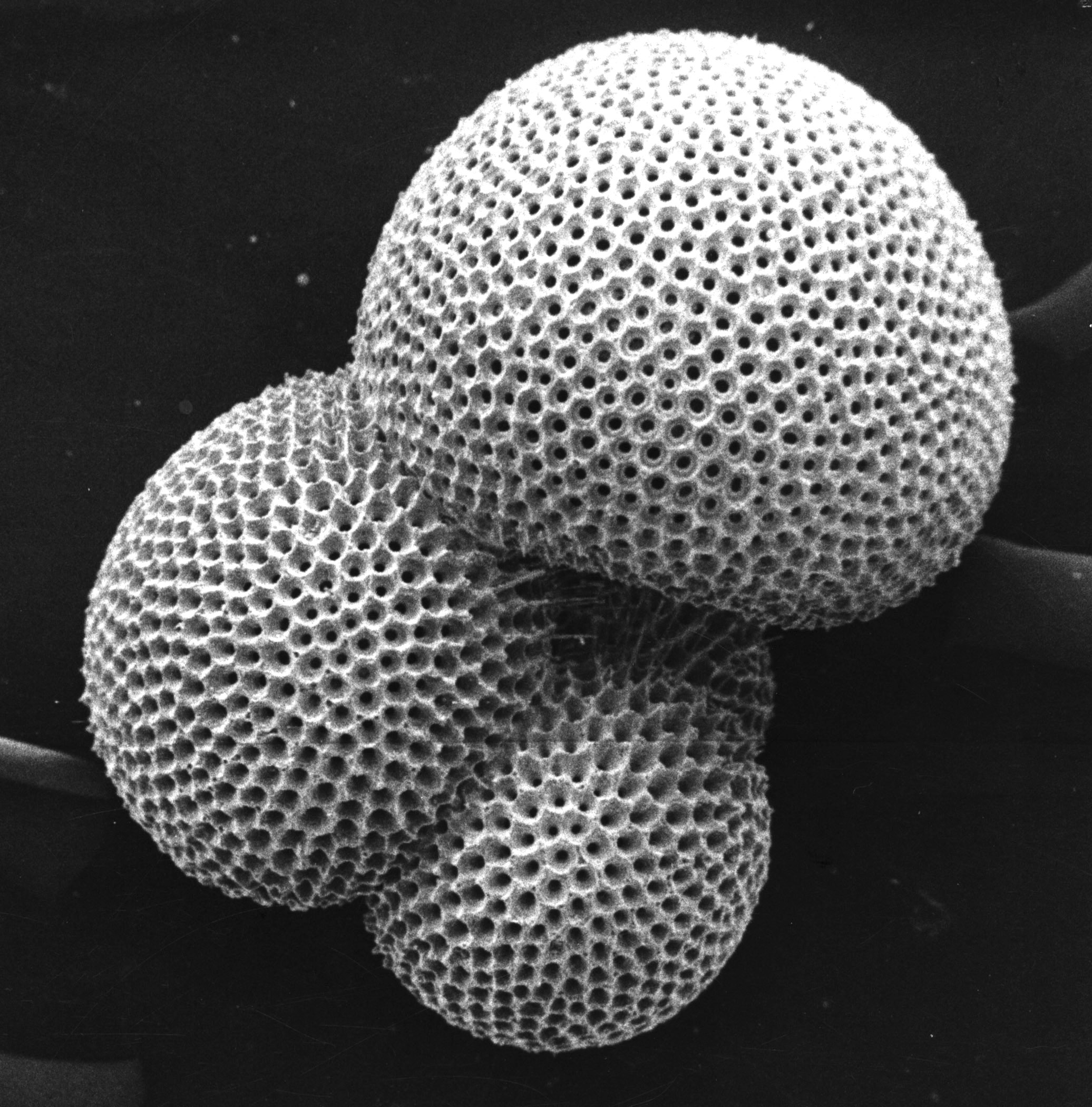
...can have more than one nucleus

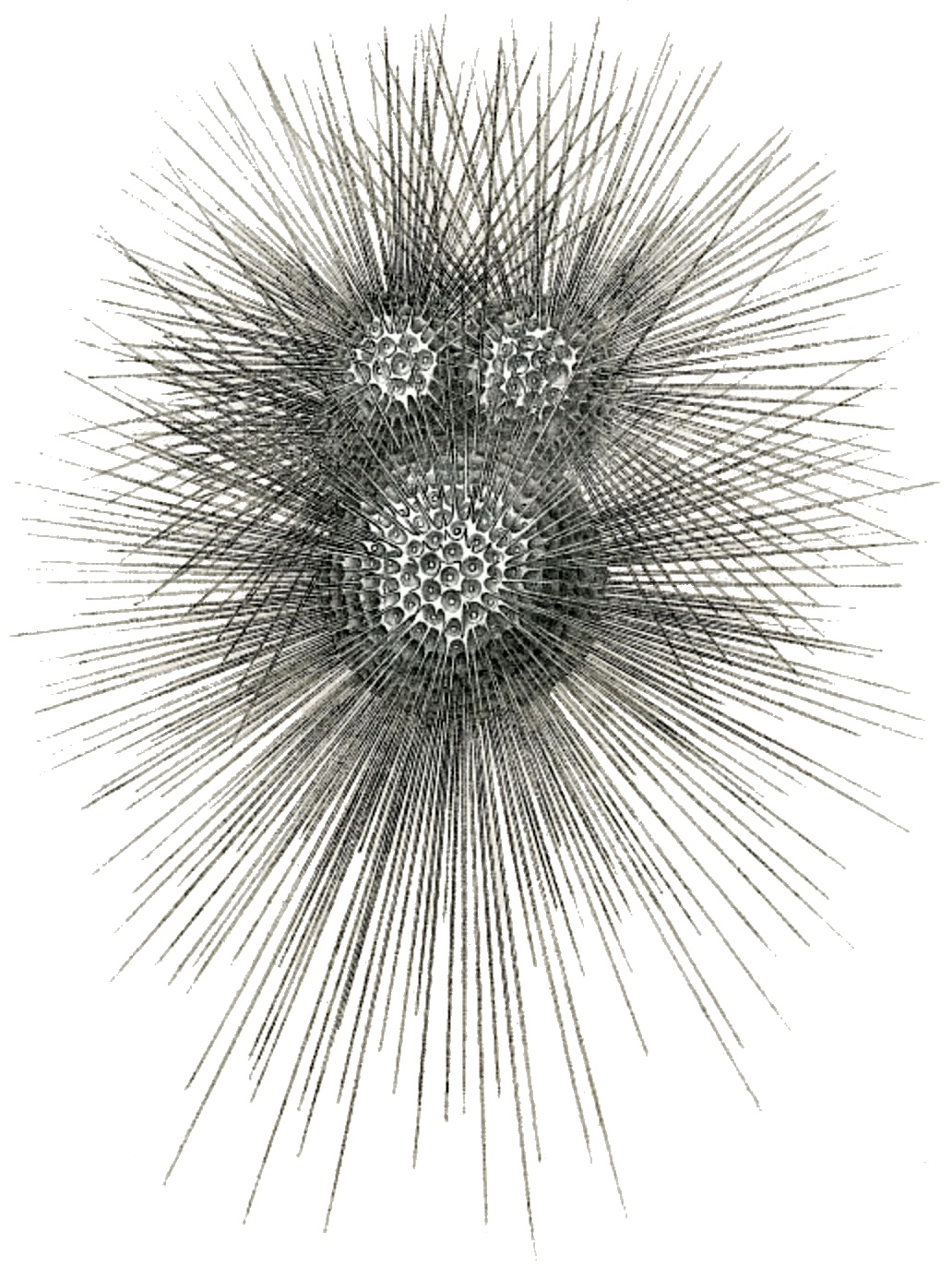
...and defensive spines

Foraminiferans are important unicellular zooplankton protists, with calcium shells.
Turing and radiolarian morphology

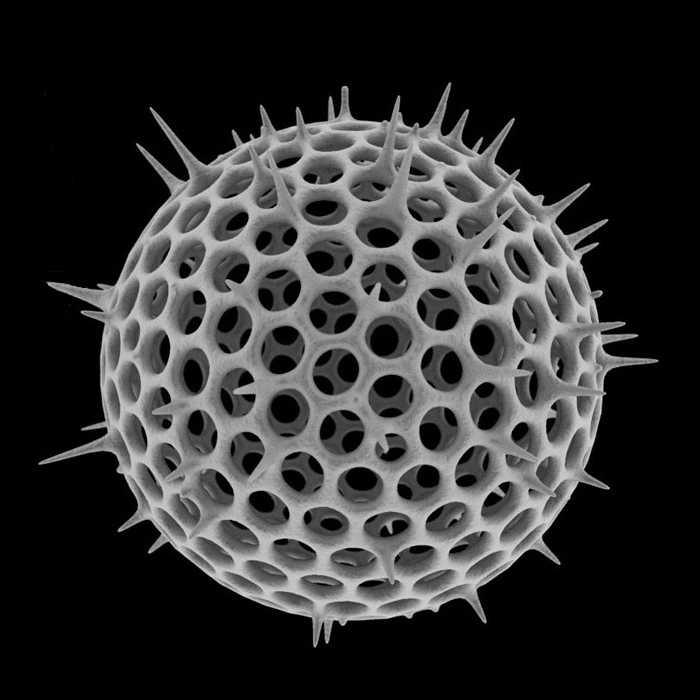
Shell of a spherical radiolarian

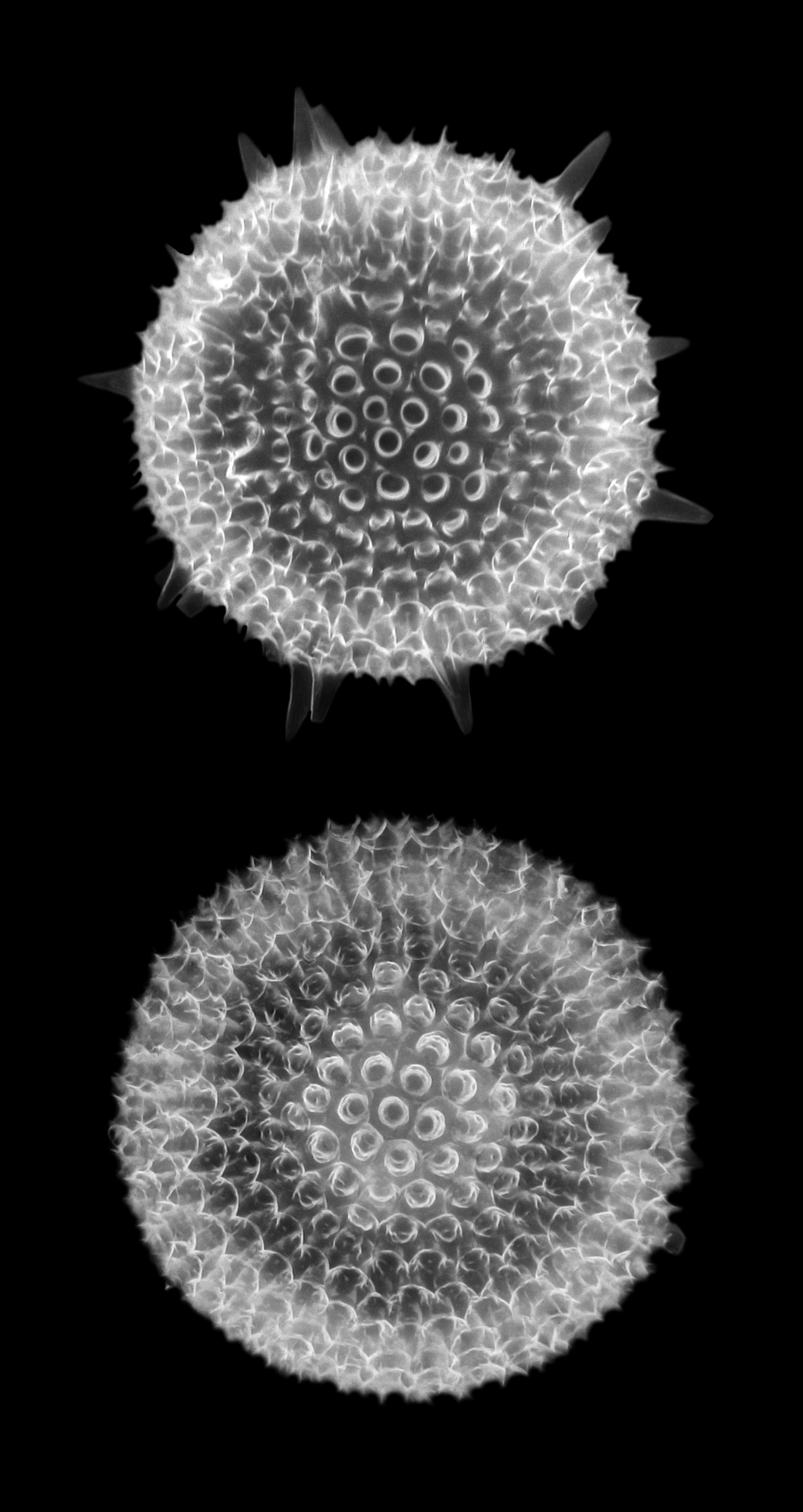
Shell micrographs

Computer simulations of Turing patterns on a sphere closely replicate some radiolarian shell patterns.

Zooplankton are generally larger than phytoplankton, mostly still microscopic but some can be seen with the naked eye. Many protozoans (single-celled protists that prey on other microscopic life) are zooplankton, including zooflagellates, foraminiferans, radiolarians and some dinoflagellates. Other dinoflagellates are mixotrophic and could also be classified as phytoplankton; the distinction between plants and animals often breaks down in very small organisms. Other zooplankton include pelagic cnidarians, ctenophores, molluscs, arthropods and tunicates, as well as planktonic arrow worms and bristle worms.

Radiolarians are unicellular protists with elaborate silica shells

Microzooplankton: major grazers of the plankton

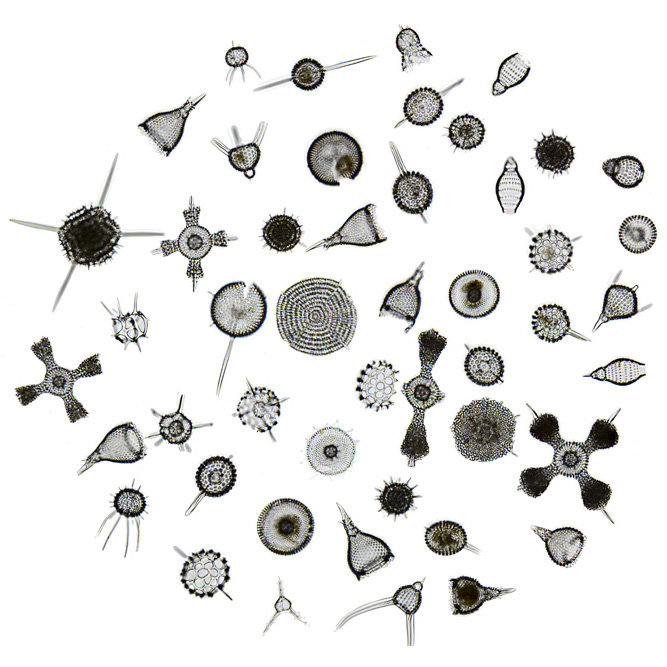
Radiolarians come in many shapes.

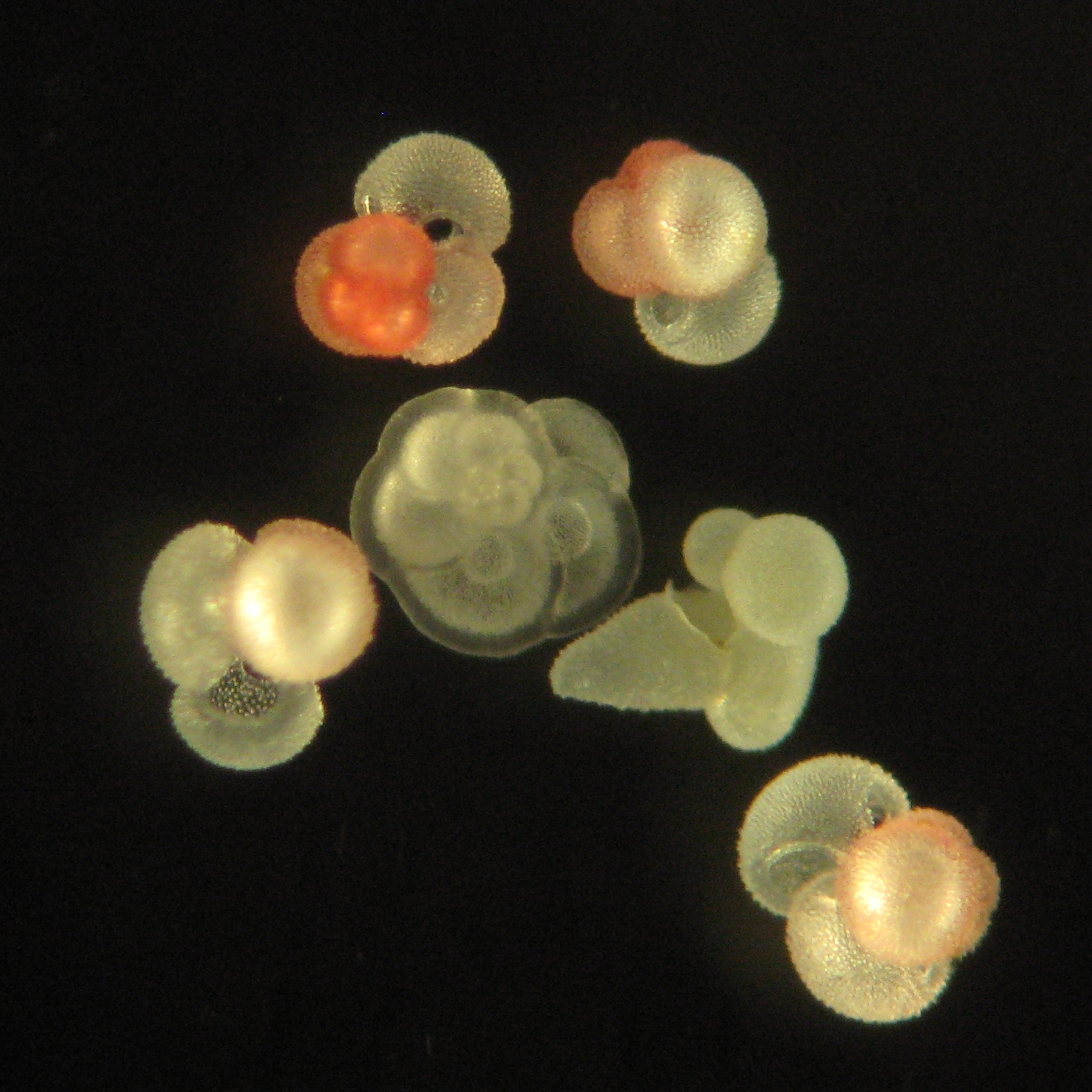
Group of planktic foraminiferans

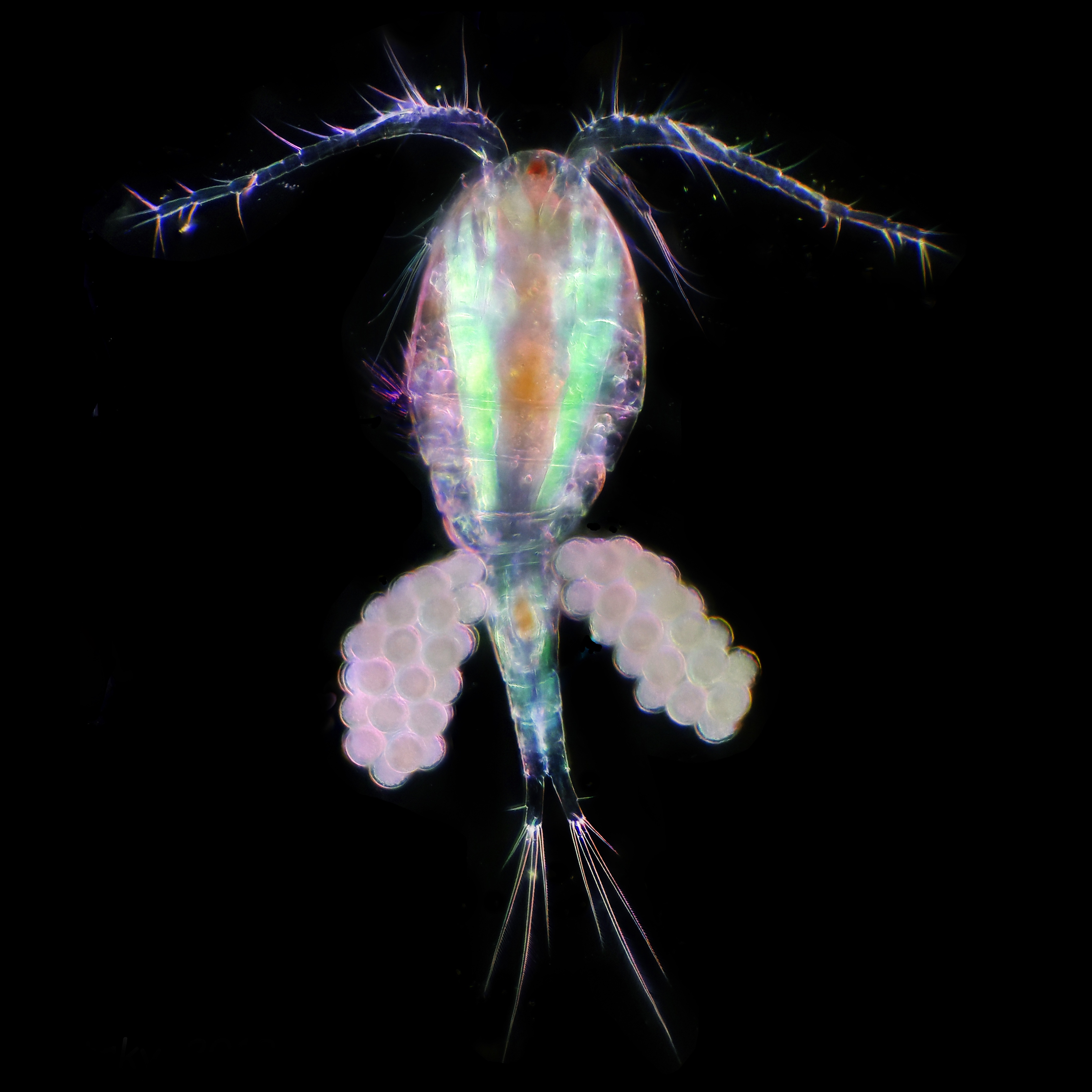
Copepods eat phytoplankton. This one is carrying eggs.

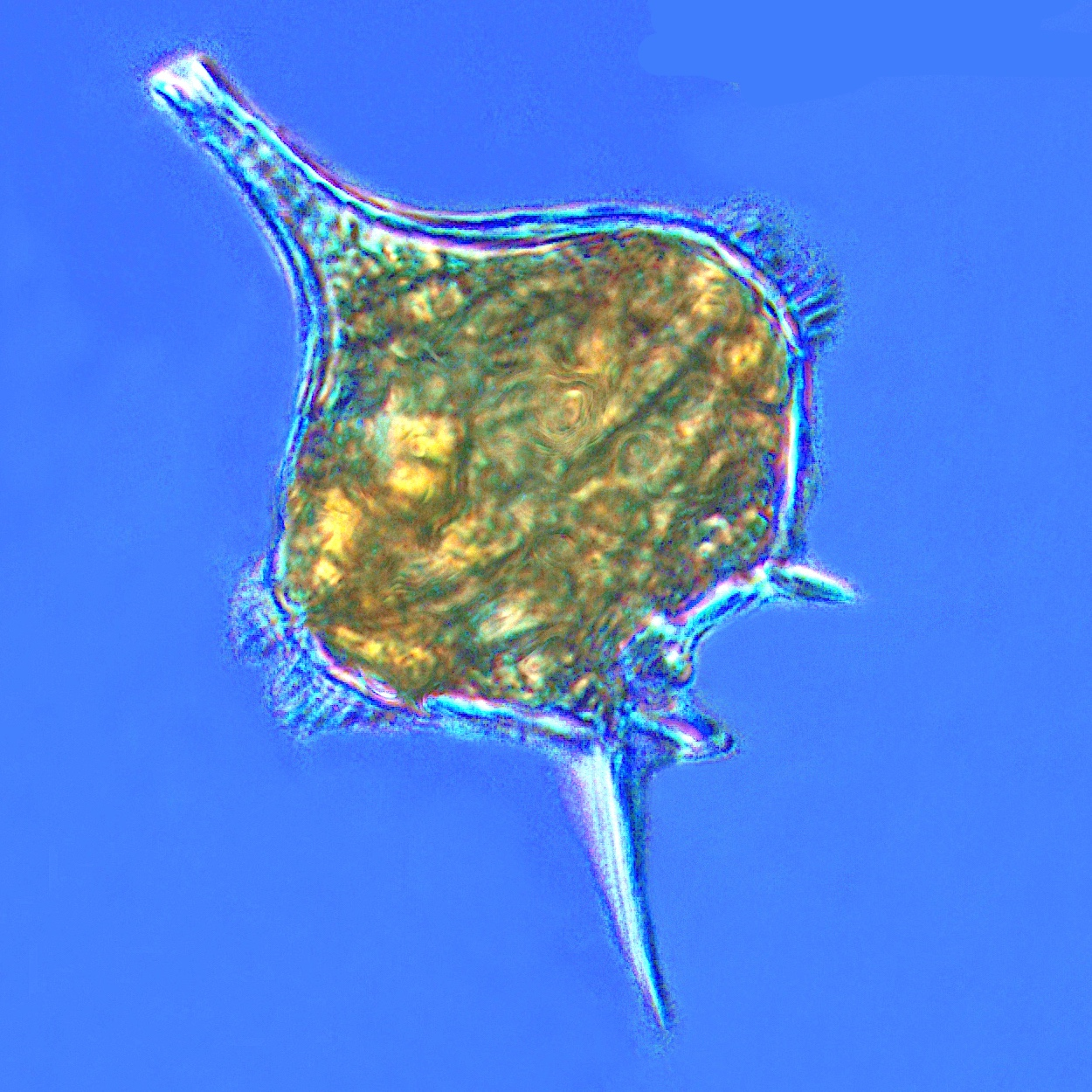
The dinoflagellate, Protoperidinium extrudes a large feeding veil to capture prey.
Macrozooplankton: Larger zooplankton can be predatory on smaller zooplankton

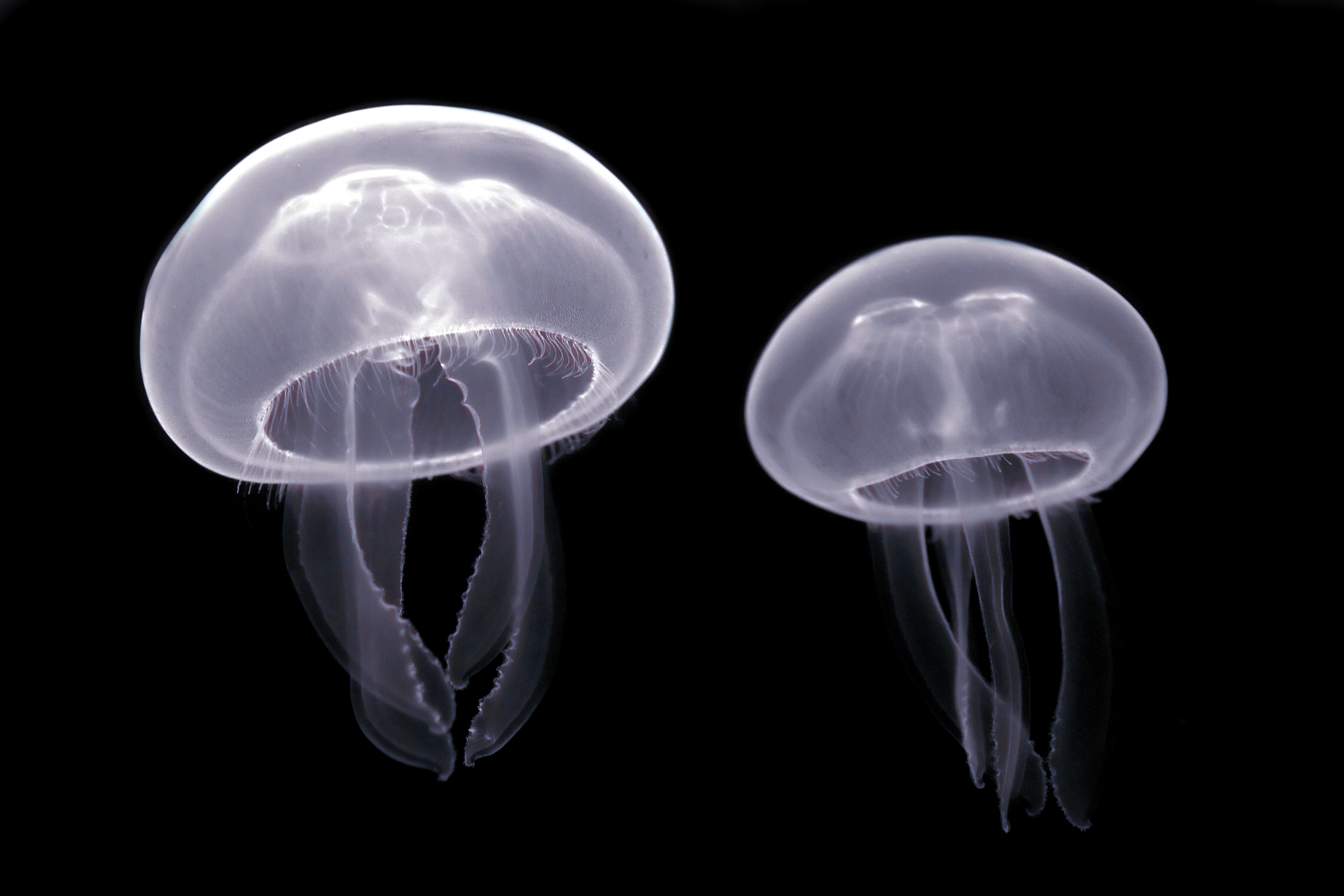
Moon jellyfish

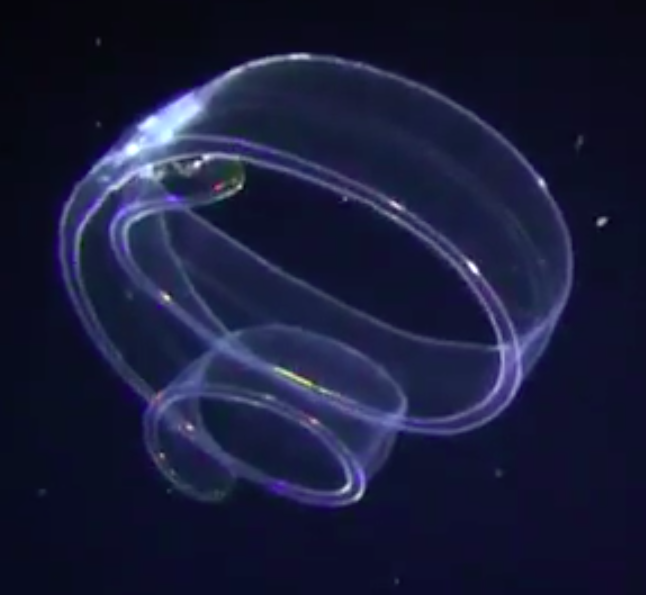
Venus girdle, a ctenophore

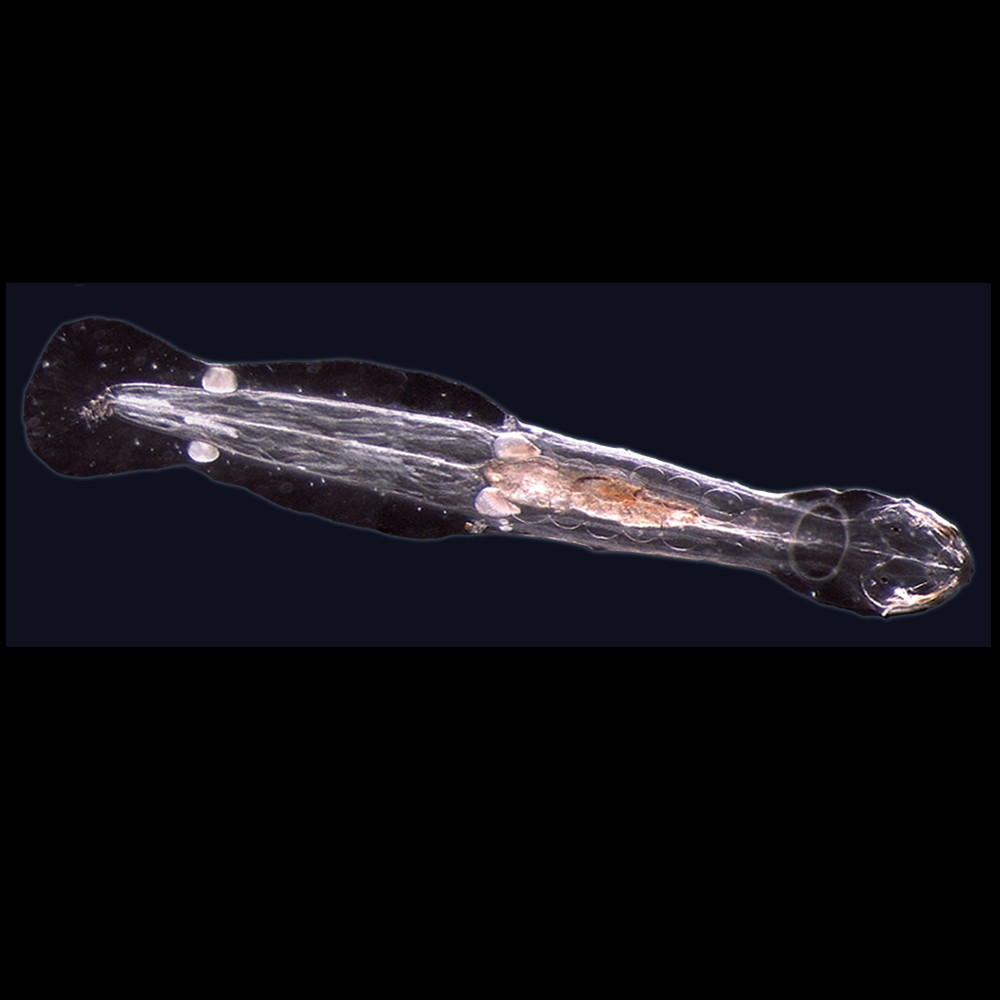
Arrow worm

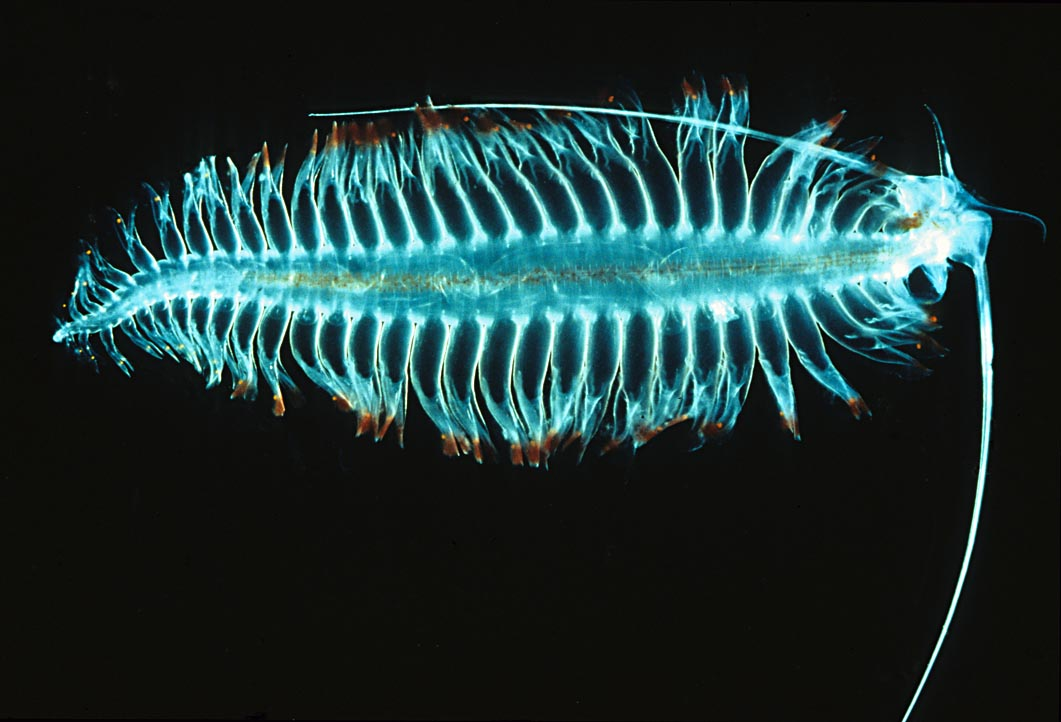
Tomopteris, a planktonic segmented worm with unusual yellow bioluminescence

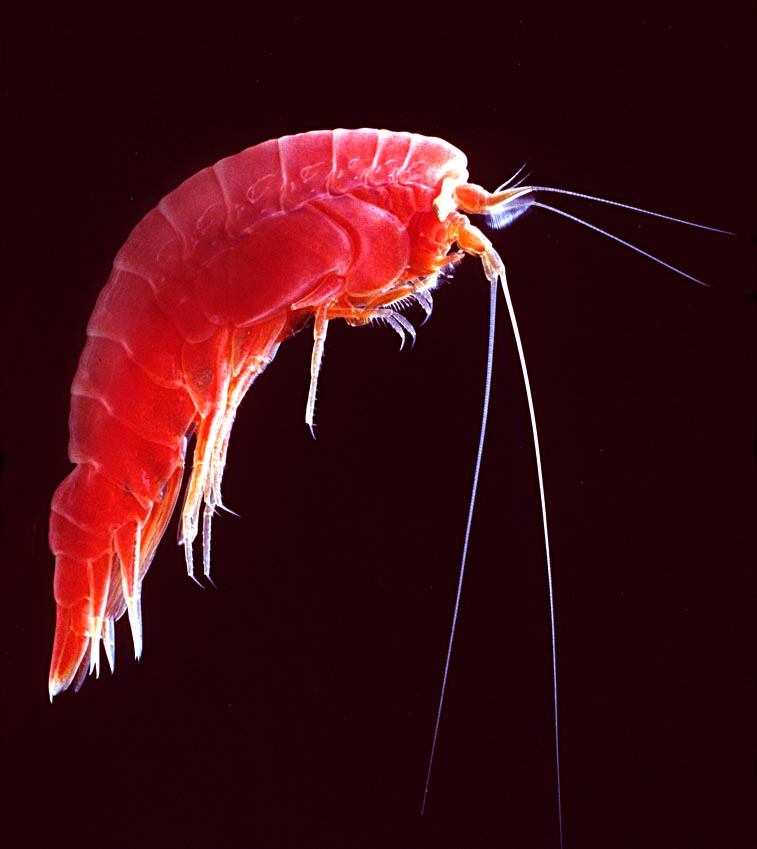
Marine amphipod

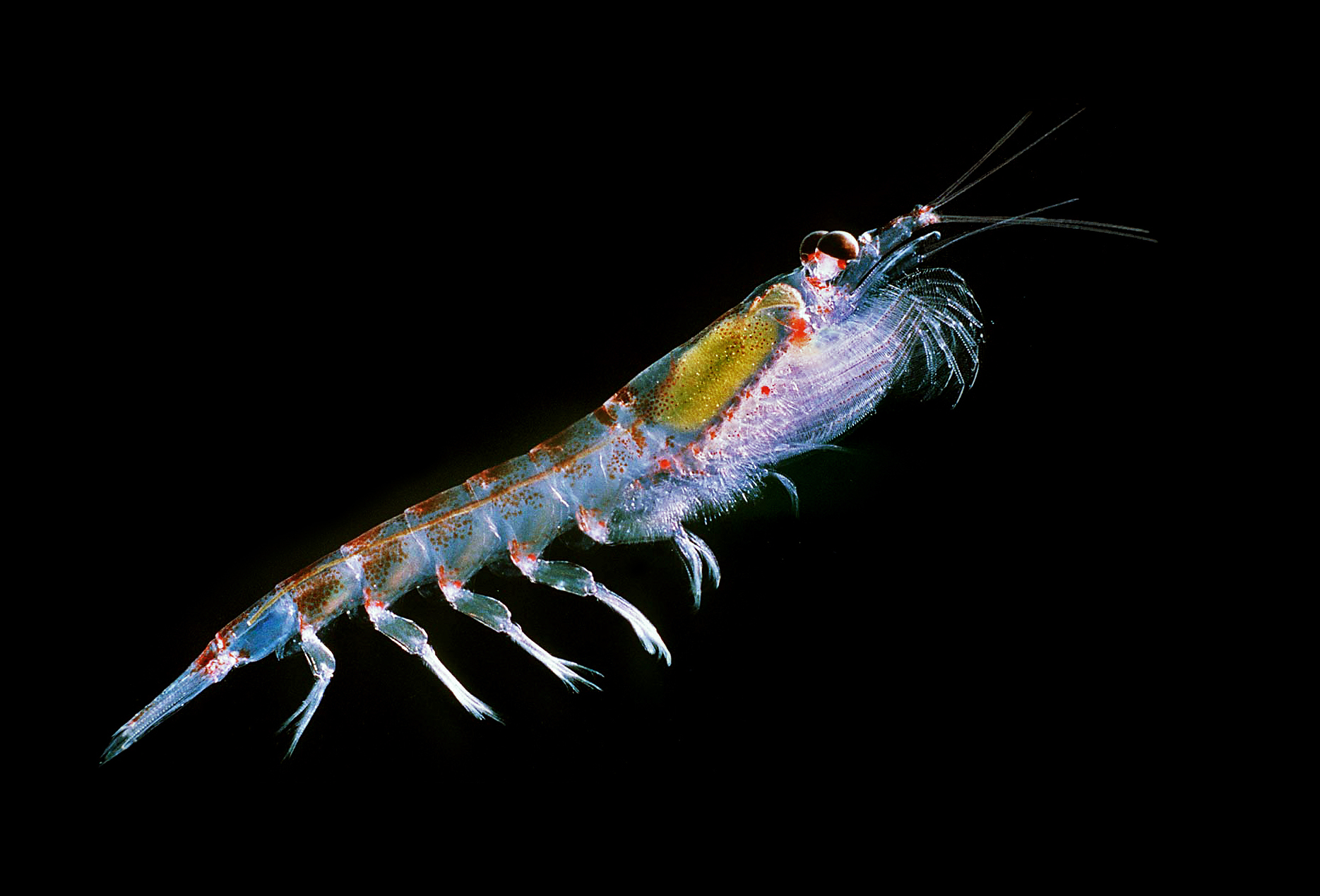
Krill

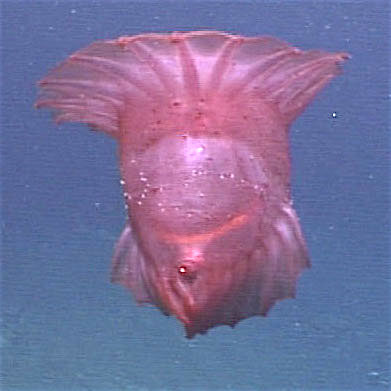
Pelagic sea cucumber

External videos
- Venus Girdle - Youtube

Many marine animals begin life as zooplankton in the form of eggs or larvae, before they develop into adults. These are meroplanktic, that is, they are planktonic for only part of their life.

Larvae and juveniles

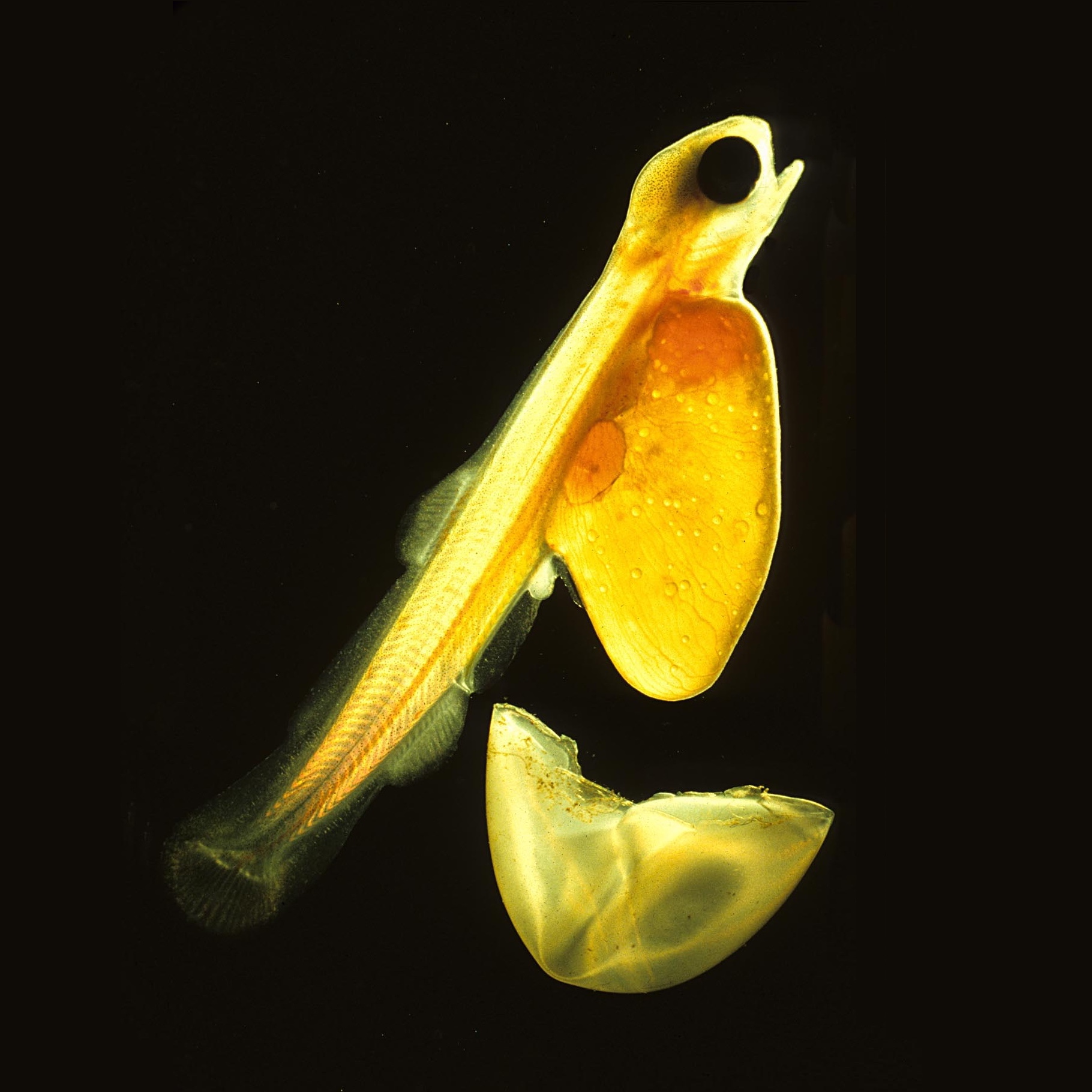
Salmon larva hatching from its egg

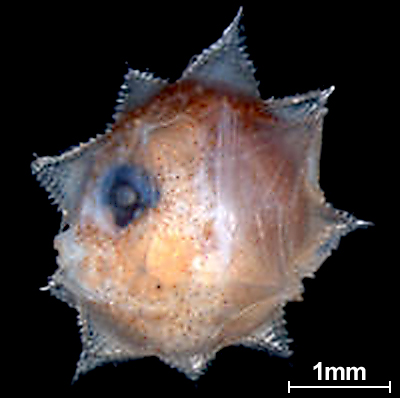
Ocean sunfish larva

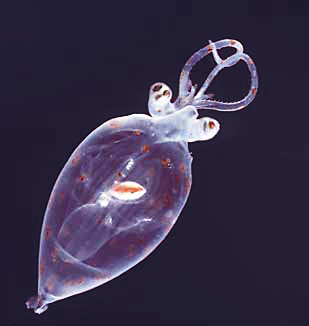
Juvenile planktonic squid

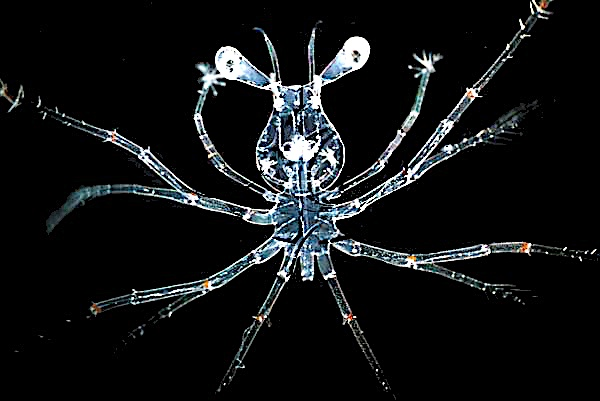
Larva stage of a spiny lobster

=== Mixoplankton ===
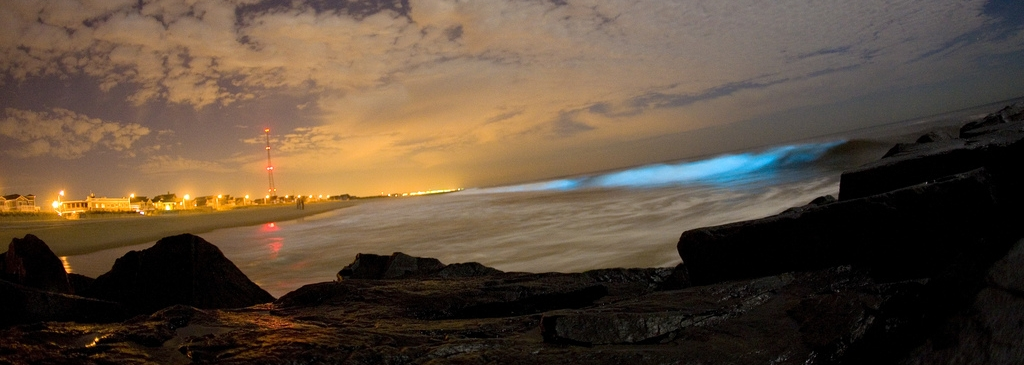
A surf wave at night sparkles with blue light due to the presence of a bioluminescent dinoflagellate, such as Lingulodinium polyedrum

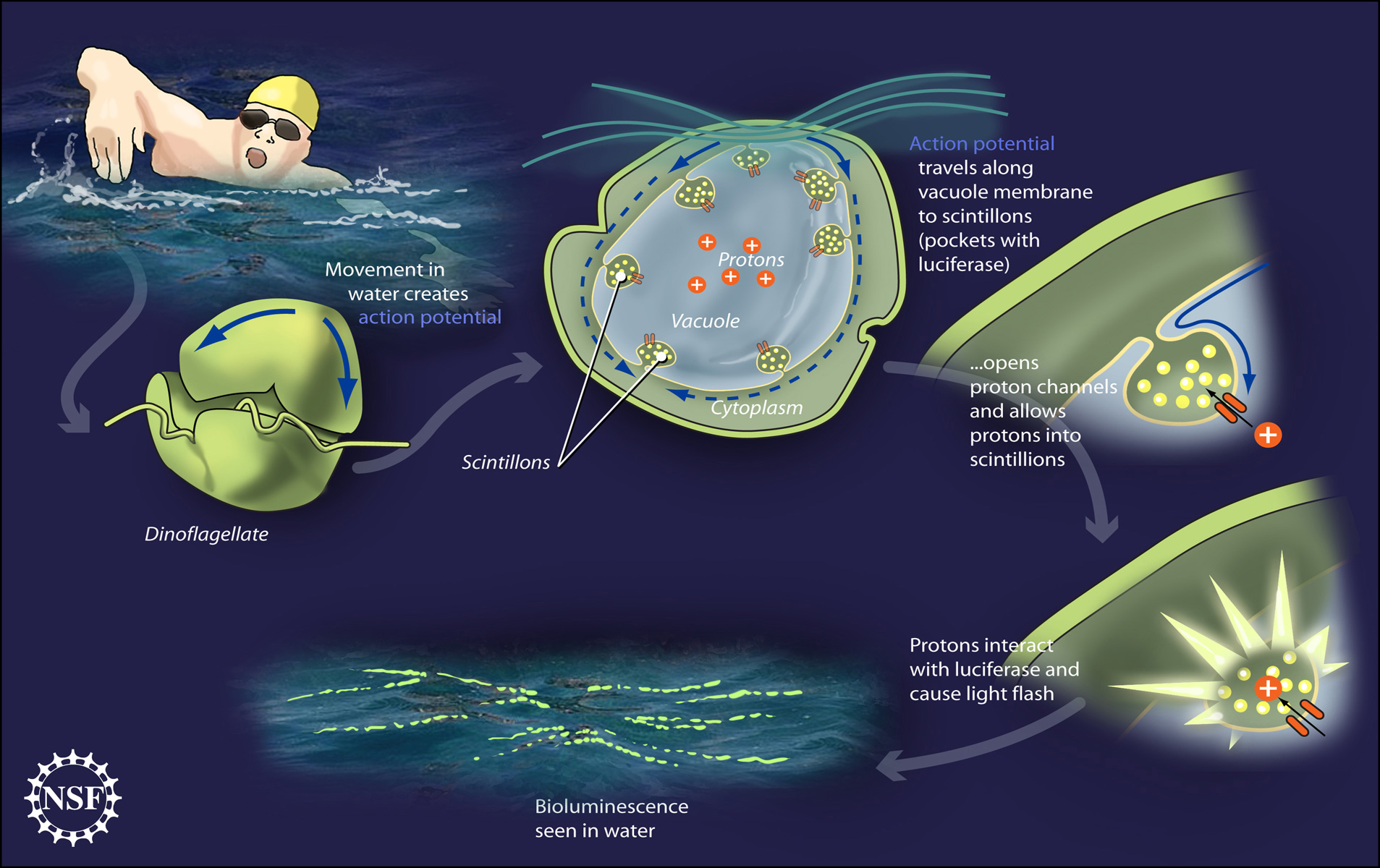
A suggested explanation for glowing seas

Mixoplankton are mixotrophic plankton, capable of both photosynthesis and predation. Instead of having a single trophic mode, like phytoplankton and zooplankton, a mixoplankton is capable of both modes, and lies somewhere on a continuum between complete autotrophy at one end to heterotrophy at the other. It is estimated that mixoplankton comprise more than half of all microscopic plankton.

Mixoplankton

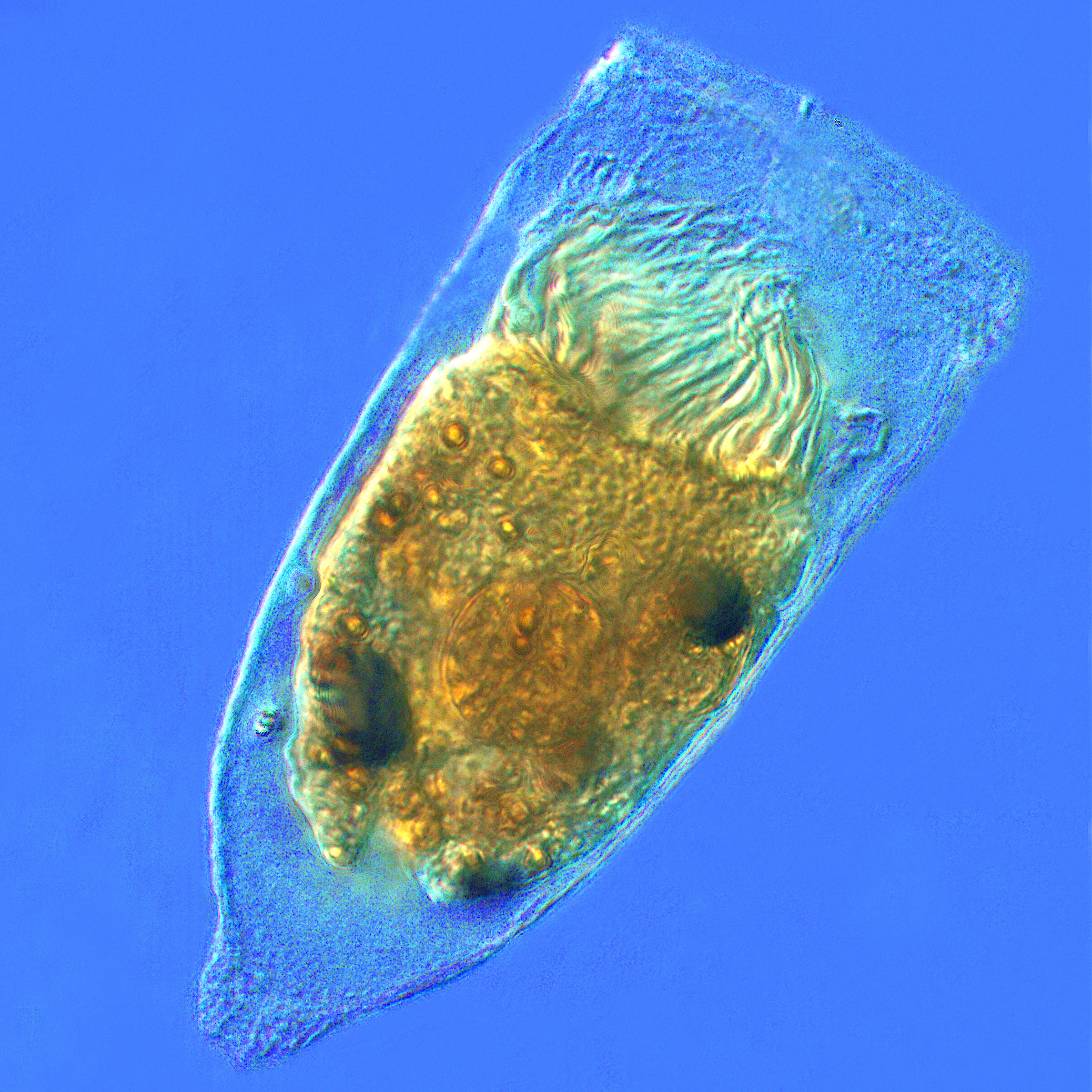
Tintinnid ciliate Favella

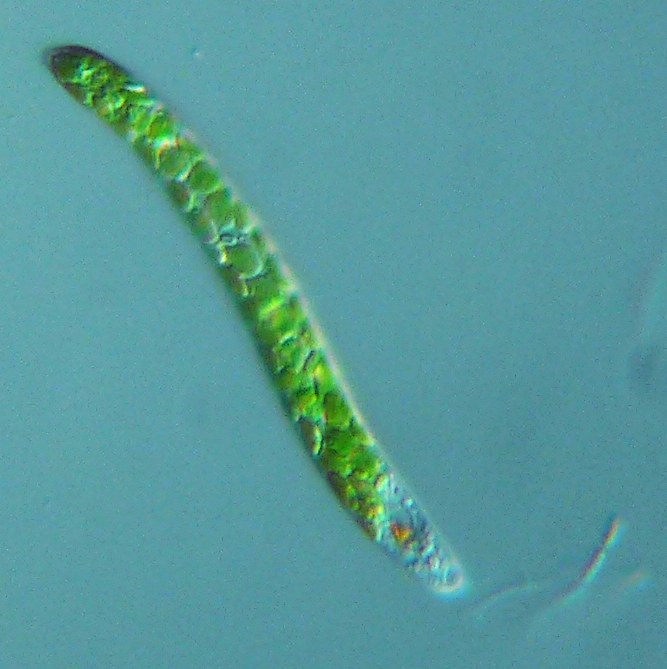
Euglena mutabilis, a photosynthetic flagellate

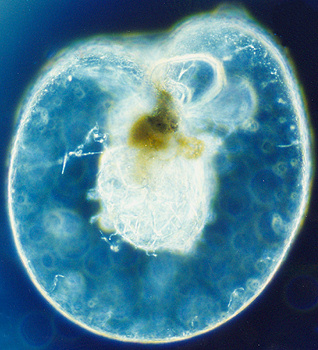
Noctiluca scintillans, a bioluminescence dinoflagellate

Dinoflagellates are often mixotrophic or live in symbiosis with other organisms. Some dinoflagellates are bioluminescent. At night, ocean water can light up internally and sparkle with blue light because of these dinoflagellates. Bioluminescent dinoflagellates possess scintillons, individual cytoplasmic bodies which contain dinoflagellate luciferase, the main enzyme involved in the luminescence. The luminescence, sometimes called the phosphorescence of the sea, occurs as brief (0.1 sec) blue flashes or sparks when individual scintillons are stimulated, usually by mechanical disturbances from, for example, a boat or a swimmer or surf.

=== Marine food web ===
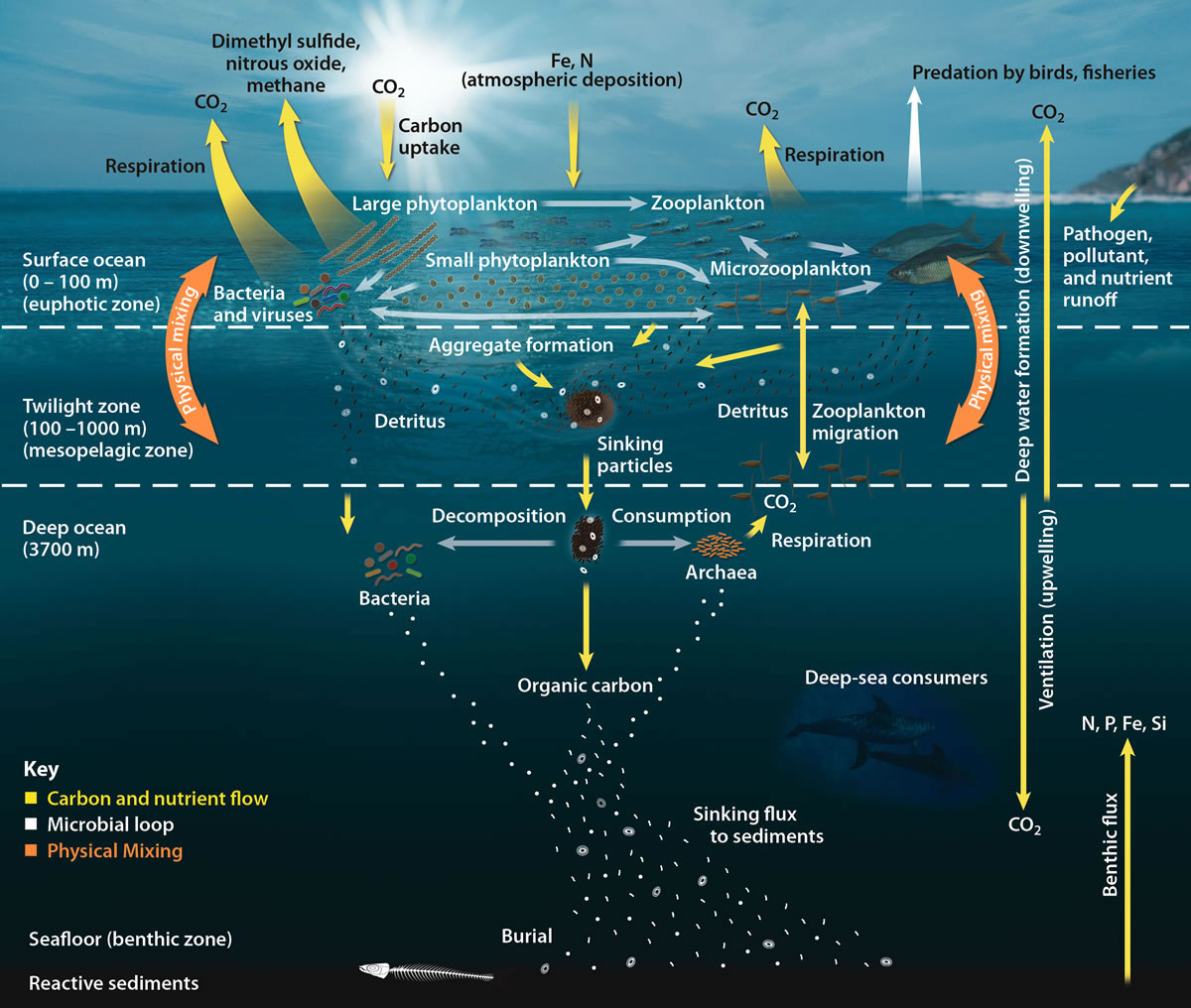
Pelagic food web

Compared to terrestrial environments, marine environments have biomass pyramids which are inverted at the base. In particular, the biomass of consumers (copepods, krill, shrimp, forage fish) is larger than the biomass of primary producers. This happens because the ocean's primary producers are tiny phytoplankton which tend to have a fast life history (are r-strategists that grow and reproduce rapidly) so a small mass can have a fast rate of primary production. In contrast, terrestrial primary producers, such as mature forests, often have a slow life history (are K-strategists that grow and reproduce slowly) so a much larger mass is needed to achieve the same rate of primary production.

Because of this inversion, it is the zooplankton that make up most of the marine animal biomass. As primary consumers, they are the crucial link between the primary producers (mainly (phytoplankton) and the rest of the marine food web (secondary consumers).

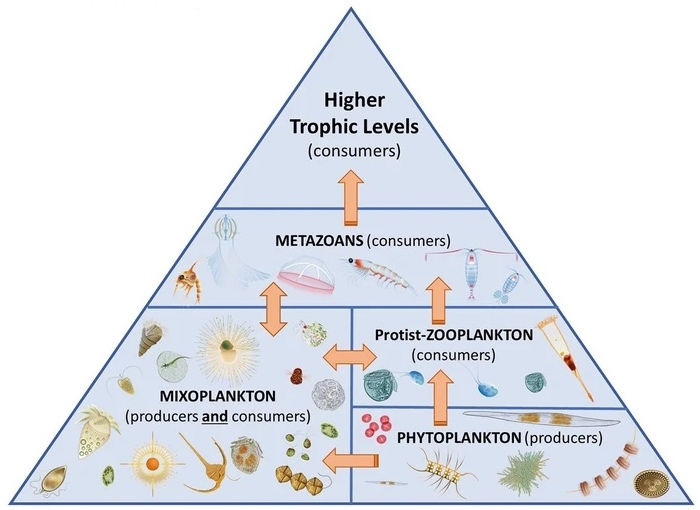
Marine food web: Mixoplankton paradigm

If phytoplankton dies before it is eaten, it descends from the euphotic zone down through the pelagic water column as part of the marine snow, and settles into the depths of sea. In this way, phytoplankton sequester about 2 billion tons of carbon dioxide in the ocean each year, causing the ocean to become a sink of carbon dioxide holding about 90% of all sequestered carbon.

In 2010 researchers found whales carry nutrients from the depths of the ocean back up the pelagic water column to the surface using a process they called the whale pump. Whales feed at deeper levels in the ocean where krill is found, but return regularly to the surface to breathe. There whales defecate a liquid rich in nitrogen and iron. Instead of sinking, the liquid stays at the surface where phytoplankton consume it. In the Gulf of Maine the whale pump provides more nitrogen than the rivers.

== Other interactions ==
=== Biogeochemical cycles ===
Marine biogeochemical cycles

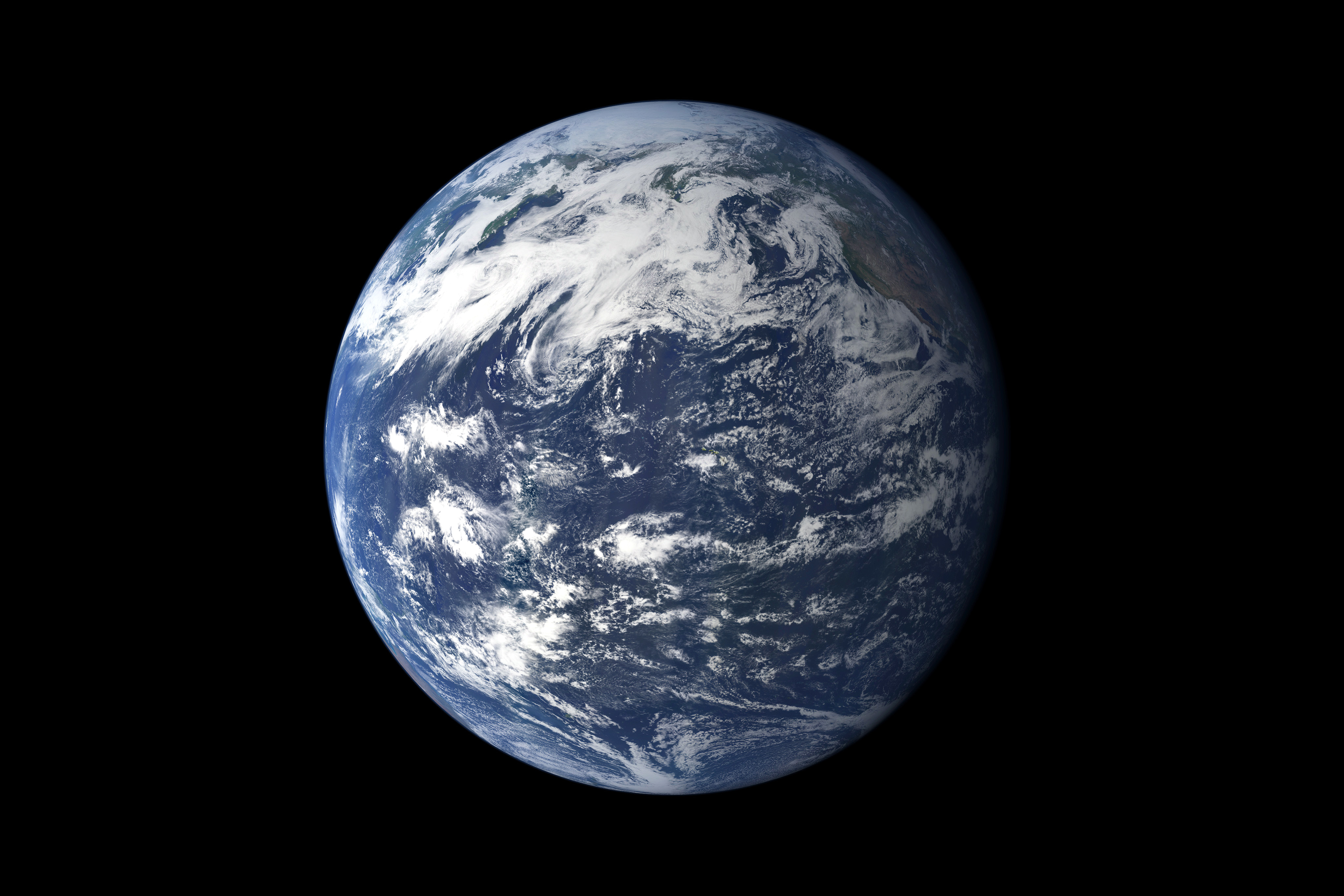
The dominant feature of the planet viewed from space is water – oceans of liquid water flood most of the surface while water vapour swirls in atmospheric clouds and the poles are capped with ice.

Taken as a whole, the oceans form a single marine system where water – the "universal solvent" – dissolves nutrients and substances containing elements such as oxygen, carbon, nitrogen and phosphorus. These substances are endlessly cycled and recycled, chemically combined and then broken down again, dissolved and then precipitated or evaporated, imported from and exported back to the land and the atmosphere and the ocean floor. Powered both by the biological activity of marine organisms and by the natural actions of the sun and tides and movements within the Earth's crust, these are the marine biogeochemical cycles.

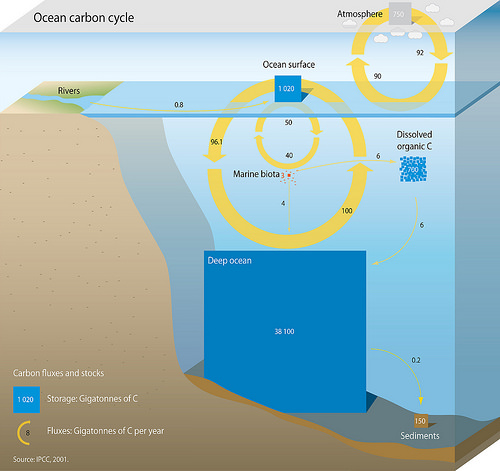
Marine carbon cycle

Oxygen cycle

=== Sediments and biogenic ooze ===
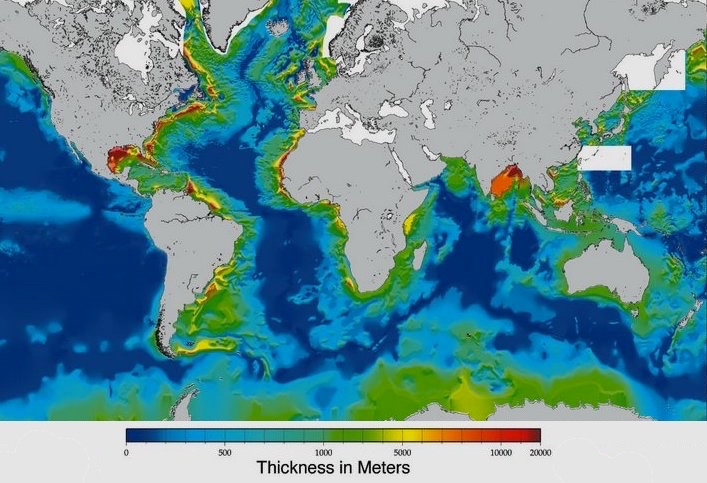
Thickness of marine sediments

Sediments at the bottom of the ocean have two main origins, terrigenous and biogenous. Terrigenous sediments account for about 45% of the total marine sediment, and originate in the erosion of rocks on land, transported by rivers and land runoff, windborne dust, volcanoes, or grinding by glaciers.

Biogenous sediments account for the other 55% of the total sediment, and originate in the skeletal remains of marine protists (single-celled plankton and benthos organisms). Much smaller amounts of precipitated minerals and meteoric dust can also be present. Ooze, in the context of a marine sediment, does not refer to the consistency of the sediment but to its biological origin. The term ooze was originally used by John Murray, the "father of modern oceanography", who proposed the term radiolarian ooze for the silica deposits of radiolarian shells brought to the surface during the Challenger Expedition. A biogenic ooze is a pelagic sediment containing at least 30 percent from the skeletal remains of marine organisms.

Main types of biogenic ooze
type	mineral forms	protist responsible	name of skeleton	description
Siliceous ooze	SiO_{2} quartz glass opal chert	diatoms	frustule	Individual diatoms range in size from 0.002 to 0.2 mm.
Siliceous ooze	SiO_{2} quartz glass opal chert	radiolarians	skeleton	Radiolarians are protozoa with diameters typically between 0.1 and 0.2 mm that produce intricate mineral skeletons, usually made of silica
Calcareous ooze	CaCO_{3} calcite aragonite limestone chalk	foraminiferans	test	There are about 10,000 living species of foraminiferans, usually under 1 mm in size.
Calcareous ooze	CaCO_{3} calcite aragonite limestone chalk	coccolithophores	coccolith	Coccolithophores are spherical cells usually less than 0.1 mm across, enclosed by calcareous plates called coccoliths. Coccoliths are important microfossils. They are the largest global source of biogenic calcium carbonate, and make significant contributions to the global carbon cycle. They are the main constituent of chalk deposits such as the white cliffs of Dover.

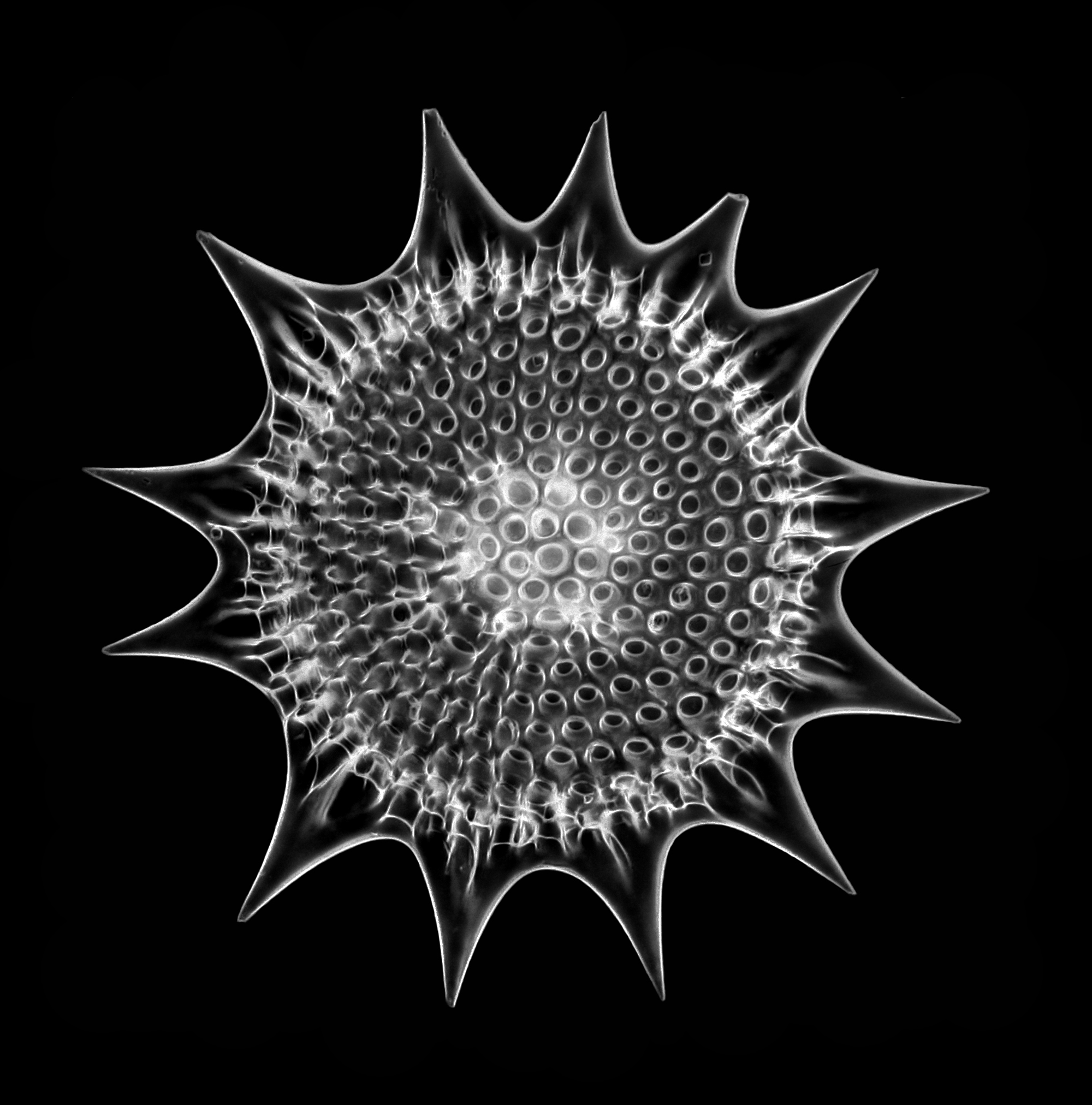
An elaborate mineral skeleton of a radiolarian made of silica.

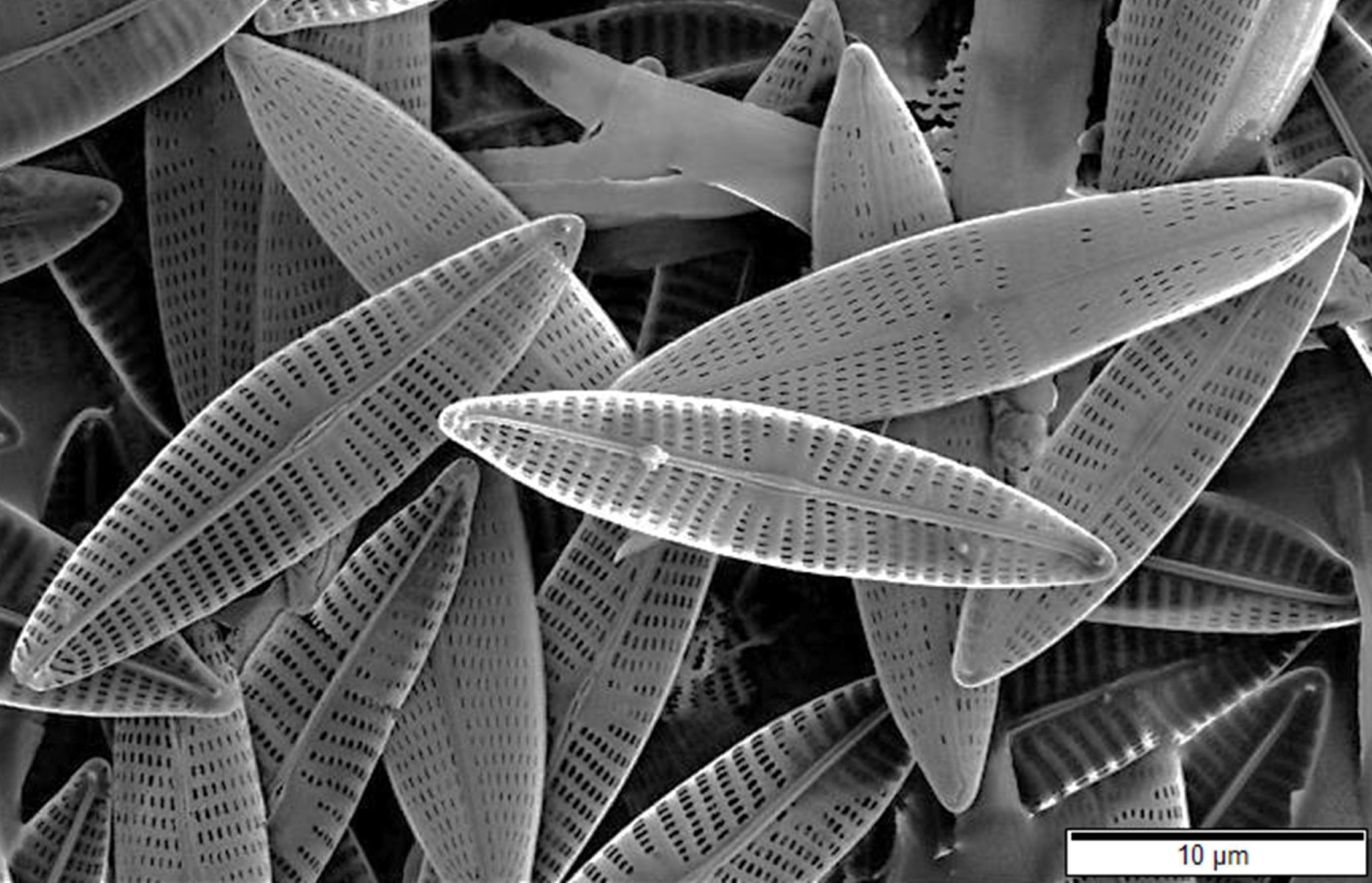
Diatoms, major components of marine plankton, also have silica skeletons called frustules.

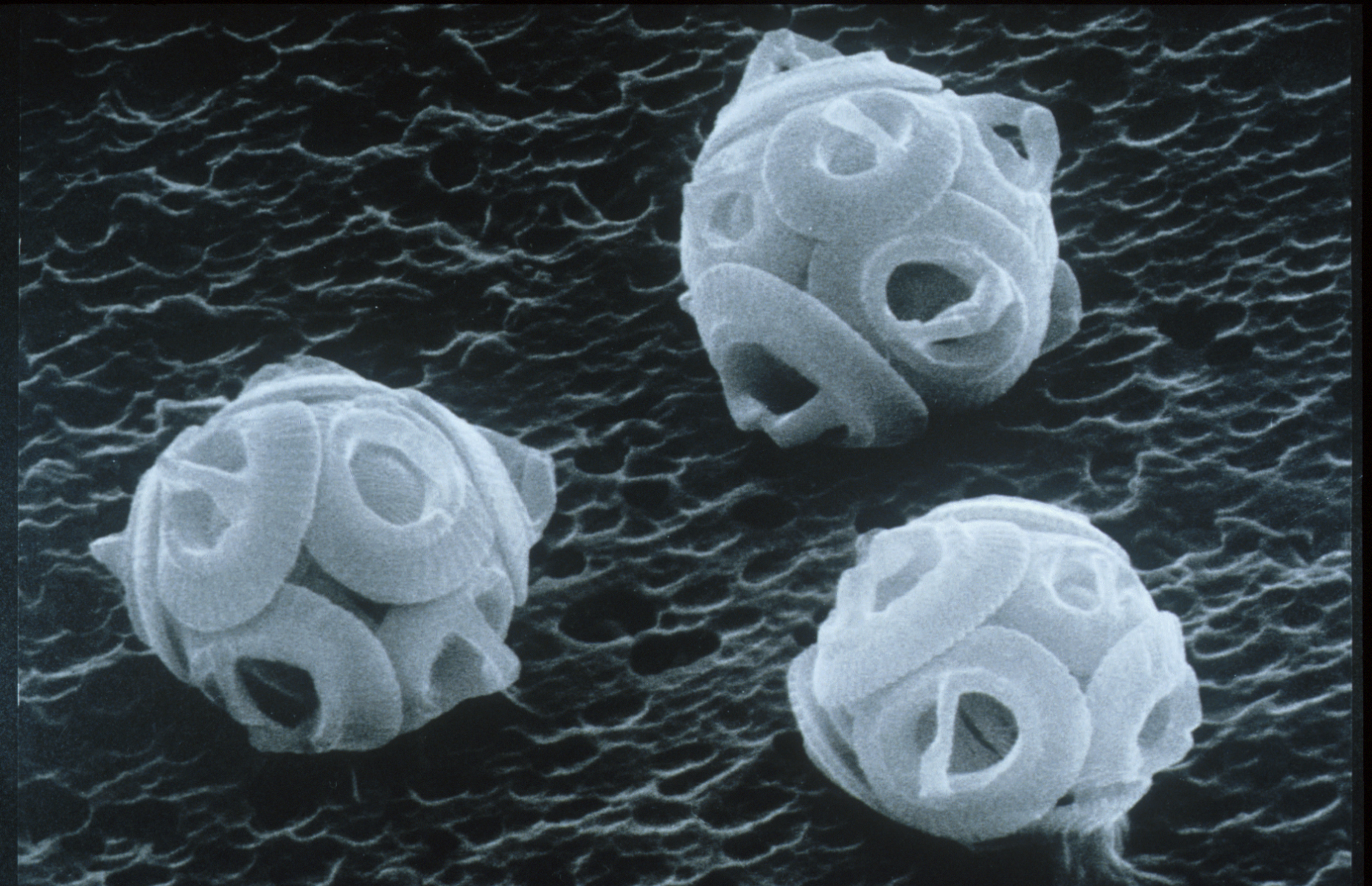
Coccolithophores have plates or scales made with calcium carbonate called coccoliths
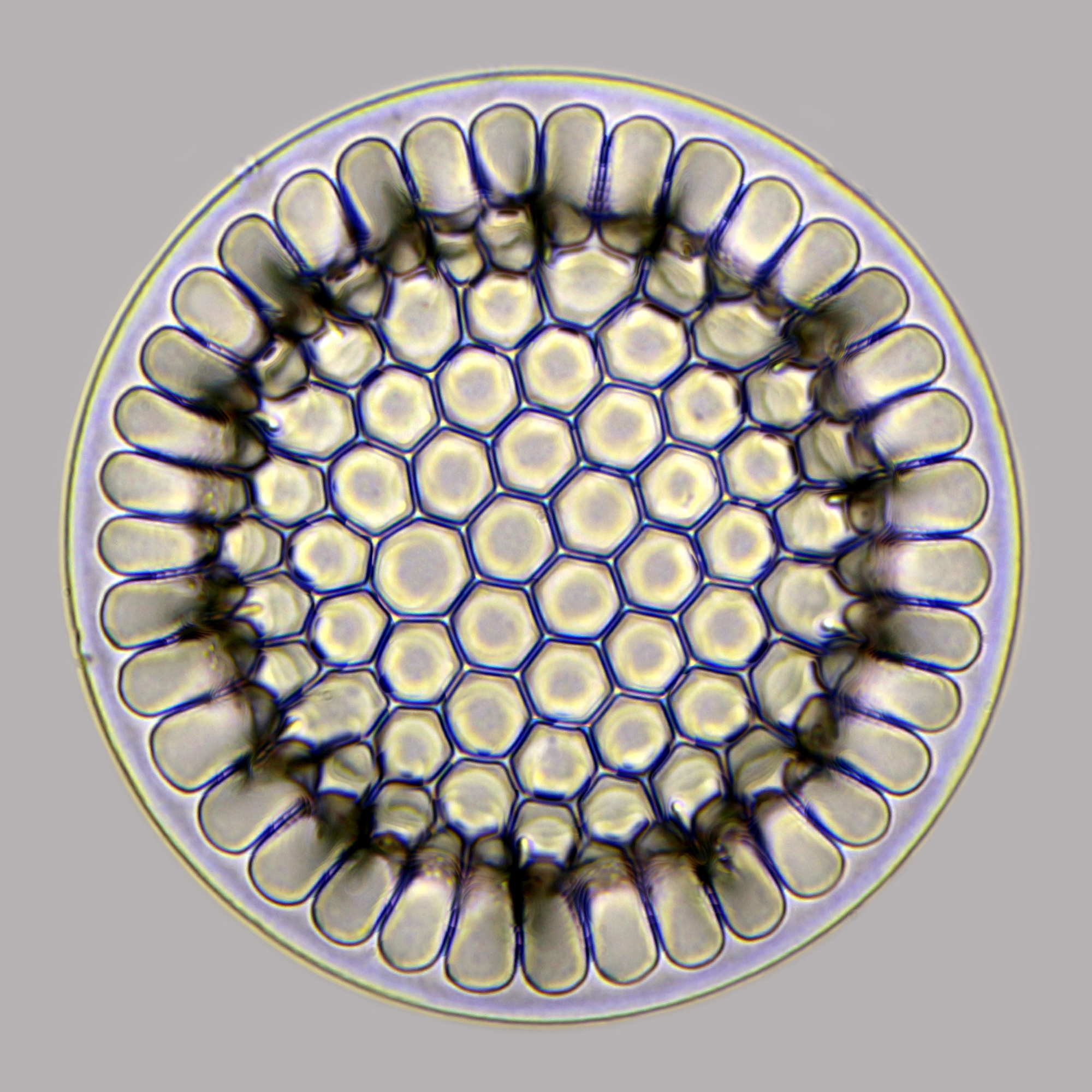
A diatom microfossil from 40 million years ago

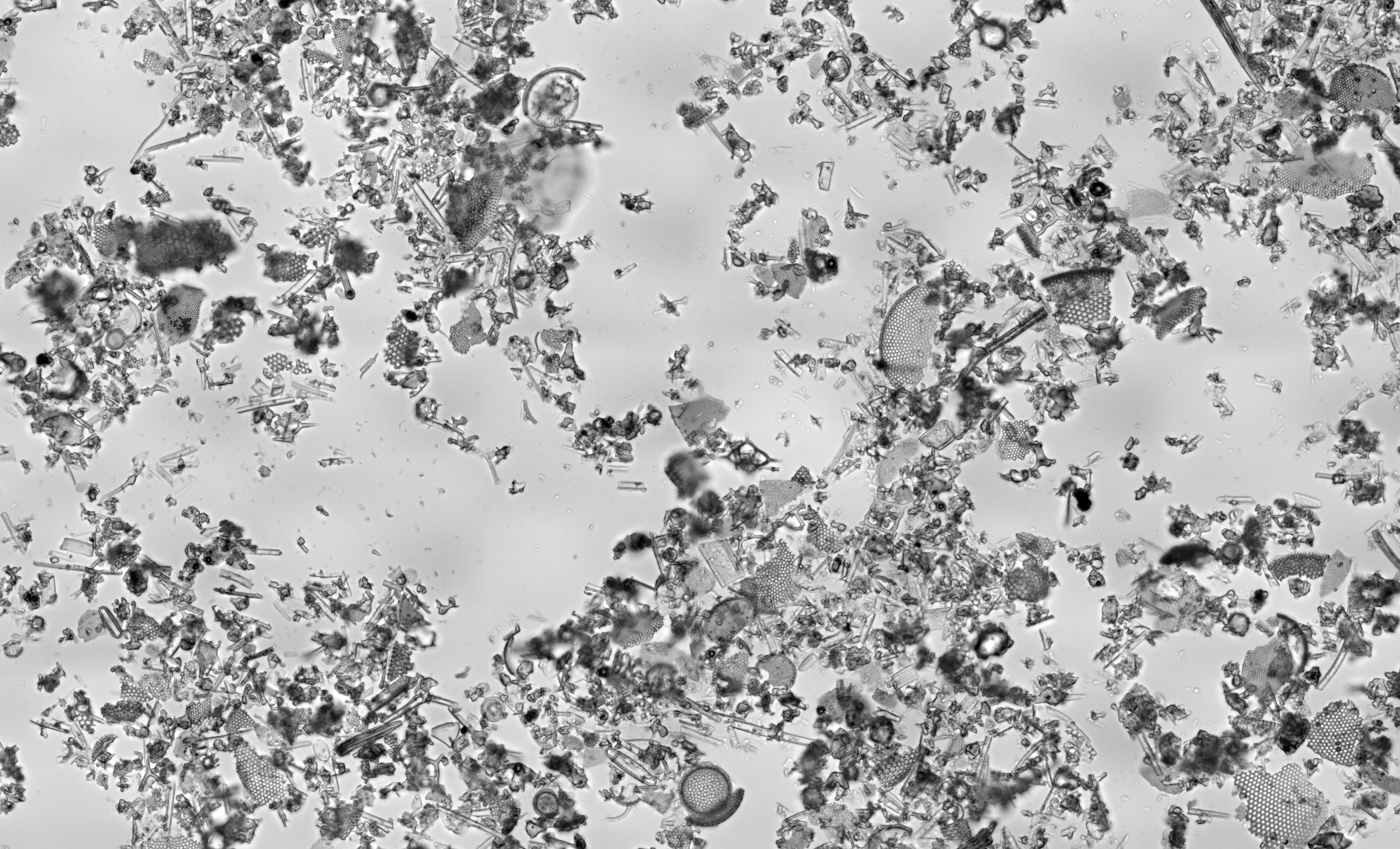
Diatomaceous earth is a soft, siliceous, sedimentary rock made up of microfossils in the form of the frustules (shells) of single cell diatoms (click to magnify).

=== Land interactions ===
The drainage basins of the principal oceans and seas of the world are marked by continental divides. The grey areas are endorheic basins that do not drain to the ocean.

Land interactions impact marine life in many ways. Coastlines typically have continental shelves extending some way from the shore. These provide extensive shallows sunlit down to the seafloor, allowing for photosynthesis and enabling habitats for seagrass meadows, coral reefs, kelp forests and other benthic life. Further from shore the continental shelf slopes towards deep water. Wind blowing at the ocean surface or deep ocean currents can result in cold and nutrient rich waters from abyssal depths moving up the continental slopes. This can result in upwellings along the outer edges of continental shelves, providing conditions for phytoplankton blooms.

Water evaporated by the sun from the surface of the ocean can precipitate on land and eventually return to the ocean as runoff or discharge from rivers, enriched with nutrients as well as pollutants. As rivers discharge into estuaries, freshwater mixes with saltwater and becomes brackish. This provides another shallow water habitat where mangrove forests and estuarine fish thrive. Overall, life in inland lakes can evolve with greater diversity than happens in the sea, because freshwater habitats are themselves diverse and compartmentalised in a way marine habitats are not. Some aquatic life, such as salmon and eels, migrate back and forth between freshwater and marine habitats. These migrations can result in exchanges of pathogens and have impacts on the way life evolves in the ocean.

== Anthropogenic impacts ==
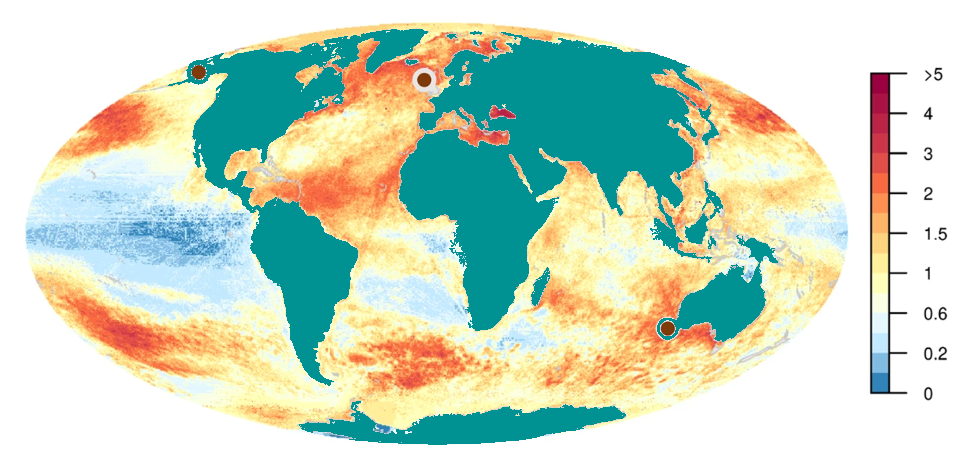
Global cumulative human impact on the ocean

Human activities affect marine life and marine habitats through overfishing, pollution, acidification and the introduction of invasive species. These impact marine ecosystems and food webs and may result in consequences as yet unrecognised for the biodiversity and continuation of marine life forms.

== Biodiversity and extinction events ==
Apparent marine fossil diversity during the Phanerozoic

Apparent extinction intensity, i.e. the fraction of genera going extinct at any given time as reconstructed from the fossil record (excluding the current Holocene extinction event)

Biodiversity is the result of over three billion years of evolution. Until approximately 600 million years ago, all life consisted of archaea, bacteria, protozoans and similar single-celled organisms. The history of biodiversity during the Phanerozoic (the last 540 million years), starts with rapid growth during the Cambrian explosion – a period during which nearly every phylum of multicellular organisms first appeared. Over the next 400 million years or so, invertebrate diversity showed little overall trend and vertebrate diversity shows an overall exponential trend.

However, more than 99 percent of all species that ever lived on Earth, amounting to over five billion species, are estimated to be extinct. These extinctions occur at an uneven rate. The dramatic rise in diversity has been marked by periodic, massive losses of diversity classified as mass extinction events. Mass extinction events occur when life undergoes precipitous global declines. Most diversity and biomass on earth is found among the microorganisms, which are difficult to measure. Recorded extinction events are therefore based on the more easily observed changes in the diversity and abundance of larger multicellular organisms, rather than the total diversity and abundance of life. Marine fossils are mostly used to measure extinction rates because of their superior fossil record and stratigraphic range compared to land organisms.

Based on the fossil record, the background rate of extinctions on Earth is about two to five taxonomic families of marine animals every million years. The Great Oxygenation Event was perhaps the first major extinction event. Since the Cambrian explosion five major mass extinctions have significantly exceeded the background extinction rate. The worst was the Permian-Triassic extinction event, 251 million years ago. One generally estimates that the Big Five mass extinctions of the Phanerozoic (the last 540 million years) wiped out more than 40% of marine genera and probably more than 70% of marine species. The current Holocene extinction caused by human activity, and now referred to as the "sixth extinction", may prove ultimately more devastating.

== Investigating and exploring marine life ==
=== Research and study ===
In order to perform research and enrich Marine Life knowledge, Scientists use various methods in-order to reach and explore the depths of the ocean. several Hi-tech instruments and vehicles are used for this purpose.

- Autonomous Underwater Vehicles (AUVs)- Underwater robots used to explore the ocean. AUVs are independent robots and can explore unmanned. They are released from a ship and are operated from the surface.
- Deep-Towed Vehicles (DTVs)- vehicles towed behind research vessels, offering a simpler alternative to more advanced underwater vehicles. They serve as versatile platforms for deploying oceanographic instruments to measure various ocean parameters, with specific models like the DTV BRIDGET used for studying hydrothermal vent plumes by moving near the ocean floor.
- Manned Submersibles- an manned underwater vehicle used for exploring, experimenting and is often used by army.
- Research vessels (R/Vs)- a boat or ship used to conduct research over a ling period of time. It is capable of transporting a diverse range of sampling and surveying equipment. Research vessels typically feature on-board laboratory space, allowing researchers to promptly analyze the materials collected during cruises.
- Remotely Operated Vehicles (ROVs)- unmanned vehicles. able to reach greater depths under water in order to collect a wider variety of information.

== See also ==
- Blue Planet – 2001 British nature documentary television series - David Attenborough
  - Blue Planet II – 2017 British nature documentary television series
- Census of Marine Life – 10 year international marine biological program
- Colonization of land
- Marine larval ecology
- Taxonomy of invertebrates – System of classification of animals with emphasis on the invertebrates
