= Marine protists =

Protists that live in saltwater or brackish water

Marine protists

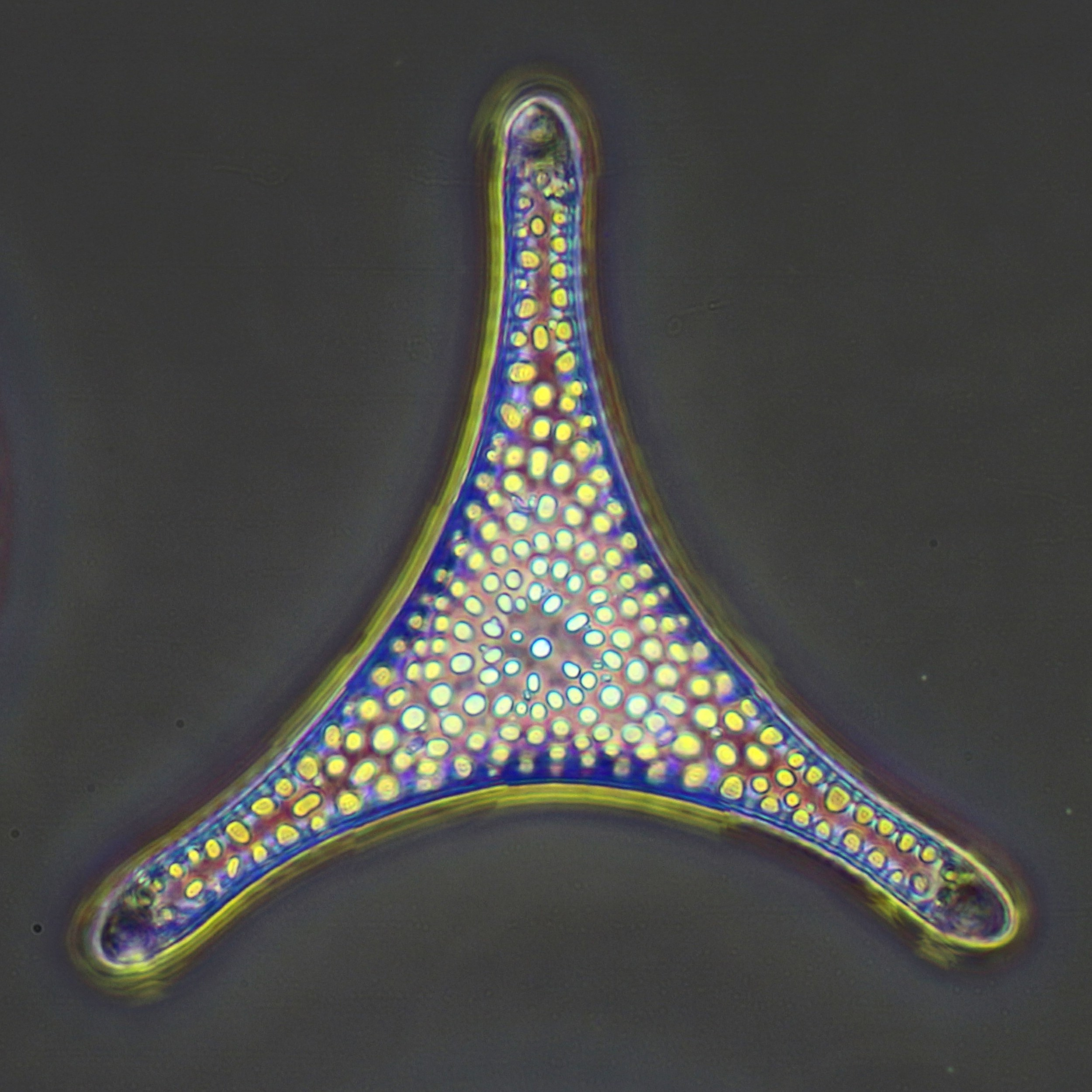
Alga (phytoplankton)

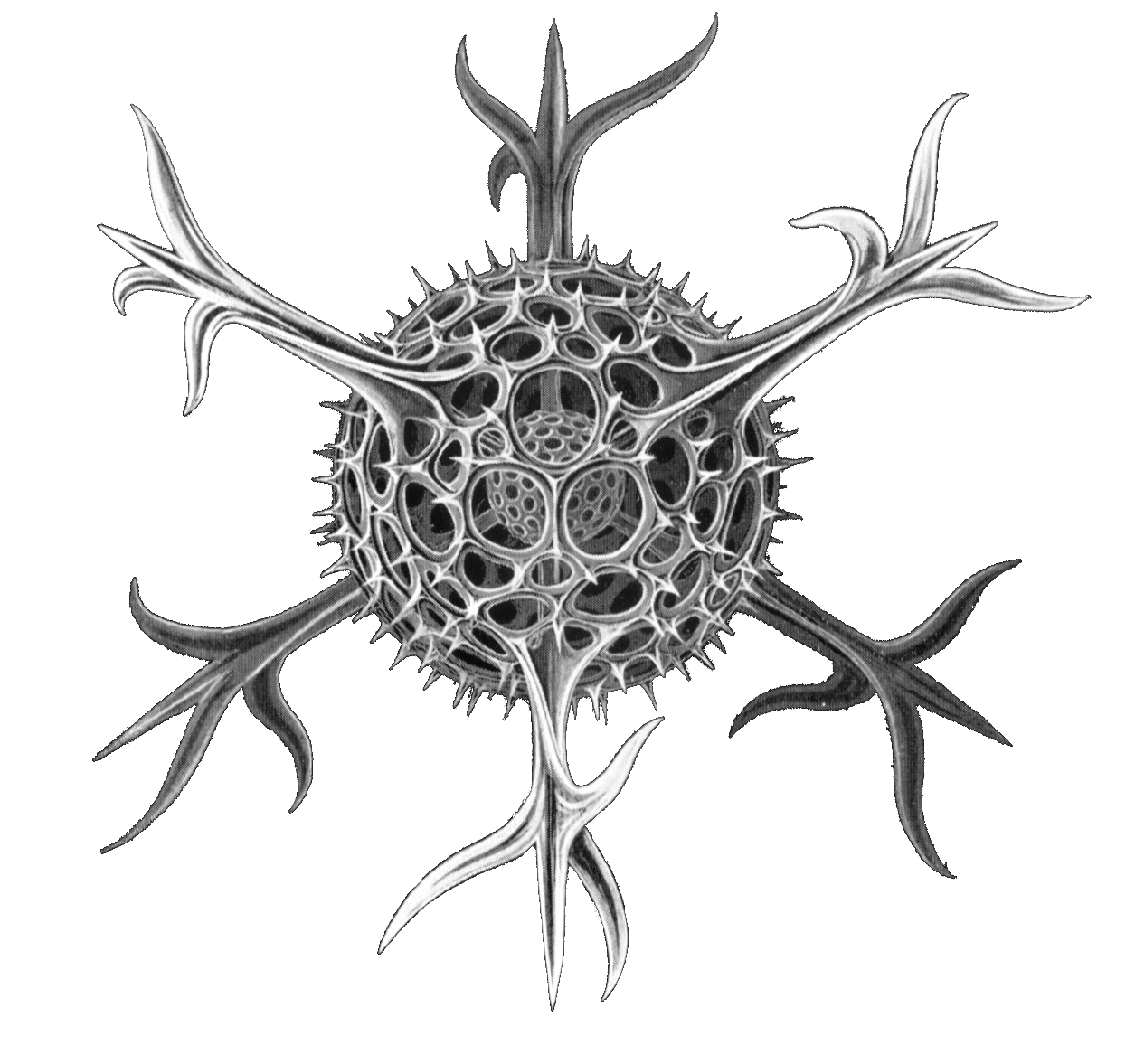
Protozoan (zooplankton)

Protists are usually one-celled microorganisms. They include algae (autotrophs which make their own food) and protozoans (heterotrophs which eat the algae for food). In recent years, researchers have discovered many protists are mixotrophs, which can function in both modes.

Marine protists are defined by their habitat as protists that live in marine environments, that is, in the saltwater of seas or oceans or the brackish water of coastal estuaries. Life originated as marine single-celled prokaryotes (bacteria and archaea) and later evolved into more complex eukaryotes. Eukaryotes are the more developed life forms known as plants, animals, fungi and protists. Protists are the eukaryotes that cannot be classified as plants, fungi or animals. They are mostly single-celled and microscopic. The term protist came into use historically as a term of convenience for eukaryotes that cannot be strictly classified as plants, animals or fungi. They are not a part of modern cladistics because they are paraphyletic (lacking a common ancestor for all descendants).

Most protists are too small to be seen with the naked eye. They are highly diverse organisms currently organised into 18 phyla, but not easy to classify. Studies have shown high protist diversity exists in oceans, deep sea-vents and river sediments, suggesting large numbers of eukaryotic microbial communities have yet to be discovered. There has been little research on mixotrophic protists, but recent studies in marine environments found mixotrophic protists contribute a significant part of the protist biomass. Since protists are eukaryotes (and not prokaryotes) they possess within their cell at least one nucleus, as well as organelles such as mitochondria and Golgi bodies. Many protist species can switch between asexual reproduction and sexual reproduction involving meiosis and fertilization.

In contrast to the cells of prokaryotes, the cells of eukaryotes are highly organised. Plants, animals and fungi are usually multi-celled and are typically macroscopic. Most protists are single-celled and microscopic. But there are exceptions. Some single-celled marine protists are macroscopic. Some marine slime molds have unique life cycles that involve switching between unicellular, colonial, and multicellular forms. Other marine protist are neither single-celled nor microscopic, such as seaweed.

Protists have been described as a taxonomic grab bag of misfits where anything that does not fit into one of the main biological kingdoms can be placed. Some modern authors prefer to exclude multicellular organisms from the traditional definition of a protist, restricting protists to unicellular organisms. This more constrained definition excludes all brown, the multicellular red and green algae, and, sometimes, slime molds (slime molds excluded when multicellularity is defined as "complex").

== Background ==
"Marine protists are a polyphyletic group of organisms playing major roles in the ecology and biogeochemistry of the oceans, including performing much of Earth's photosynthesis and driving the carbon, nitrogen, and silicon cycles. In addition, marine protists occupy key positions in the tree of life, including as the closest relatives of metazoans [animals]... Unicellular eukaryotes are often lumped as 'protists', a term that is useful despite its taxonomic irrelevance and origin as a definition by exclusion—a protist being any eukaryote that's not a plant, animal, or fungus".

The ocean represents the largest continuous planetary ecosystem, hosting an enormous variety of organisms, which include microscopic biota such as unicellular eukaryotes (protists). Despite their small size, protists play key roles in marine biogeochemical cycles and harbour tremendous evolutionary diversity. Notwithstanding their significance for understanding the evolution of life on Earth and their role in marine food webs, as well as driving biogeochemical cycles to maintain habitability, little is known about their cell biology including reproduction, metabolism and signaling. Most of the biological knowledge available is based on comparison of proteins from cultured species to homologs in genetically tractable model taxa. A main impediment to understanding the cell biology of these diverse eukaryotes is that protocols for genetic modification are available for only a small number of species that represent neither the most ecologically relevant protists nor the breadth of eukaryotic diversity. Even so, in the decade to 2020, genome and transcriptome sequencing initiatives have resulted in nearly 120 million unigenes being identified in protists, which is facilitating the development of genetic tools for model species.

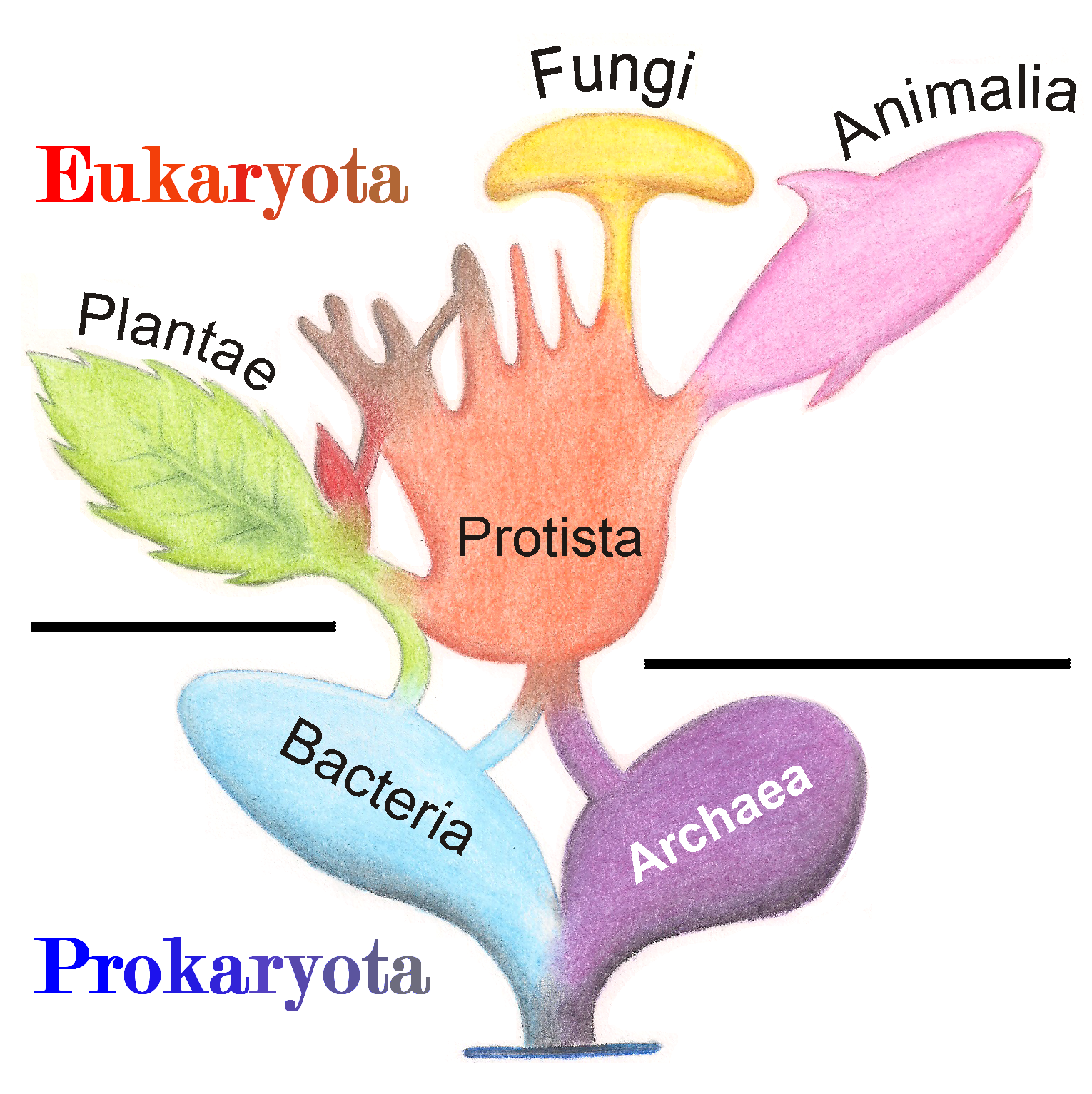
Phylogenetic and symbiogenetic tree of living organisms, showing a schematic view of the central position occupied by the protista (protists)

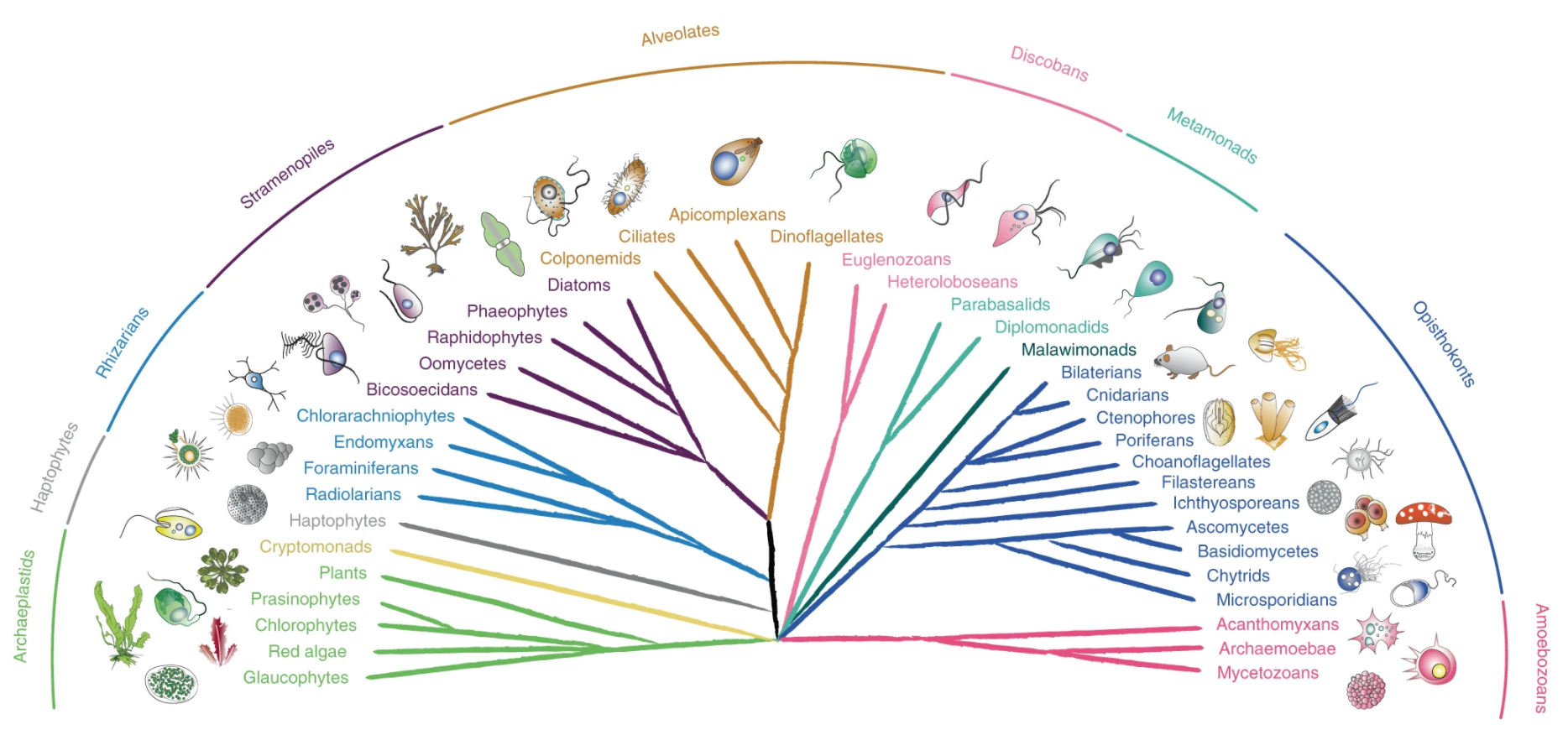
Schematic view of the eukaryotic tree of life with effigies of main marine protist representatives

== Trophic modes ==
Protists can be divided broadly into four groups depending on whether their nutrition is plant-like, animal-like, fungus-like, or a mixture of these.

Protists according to how they get food
Type of protist		Description	Example	Some other examples
Plant-like	Algae (see below)	Autotrophic protists that make their own food without needing to consume other organisms, usually by photosynthesis (sometimes by chemosynthesis)	Green algae, Pyramimonas	Red and brown algae, diatoms, coccolithophores and some dinoflagellates. Plant-like protists are important components of phytoplankton discussed below.
Animal-like	Protozoans (see below)	Heterotrophic protists that get their food consuming other organisms (bacteria, archaea and small algae)	Radiolarian protist as drawn by Haeckel	Foraminiferans, and some marine amoebae, ciliates and flagellates.
Fungal-like	Slime moulds and slime nets	Saprotrophic protists that get their food from the remains of organisms that have broken down and decayed	Marine slime nets form labyrinthine networks of tubes in which amoeba without pseudopods can travel	Marine lichen
Mixotrophs	Various (see below)	Mixotrophic and osmotrophic protists that get their food from a combination of the above	Euglena mutabilis, a photosynthetic flagellate	Many marine mixotrops are found among protists, particularly among ciliates and dinoflagellates

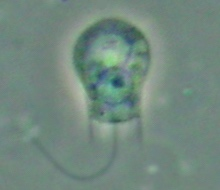
Micrograph

Cell schematic

Choanoflagellates, unicellular "collared" flagellate protists, are thought to be the closest living relatives of the animals.
Single-celled and microscopic protists

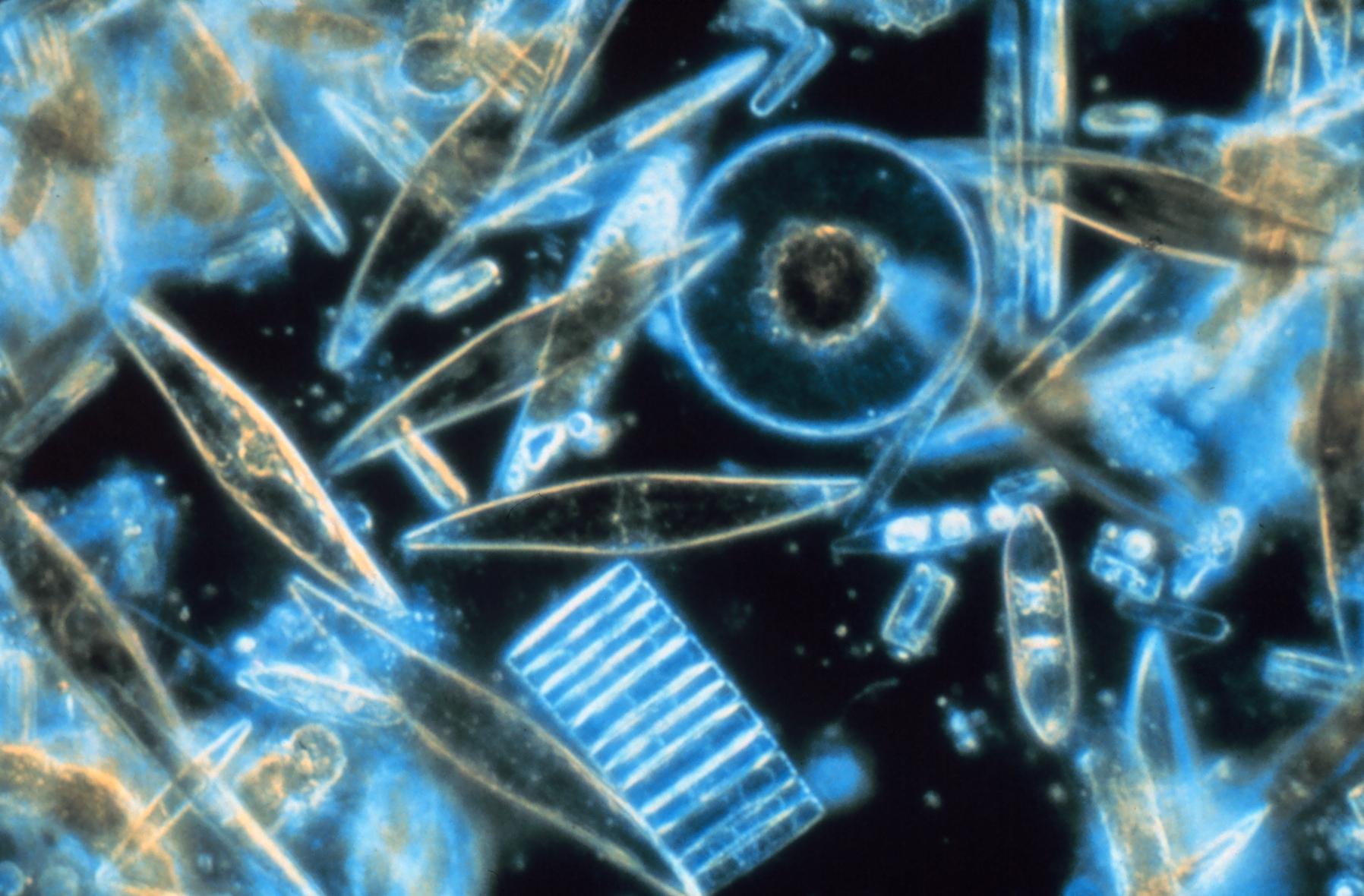
Diatoms are a major algae group generating about 20% of world oxygen production.

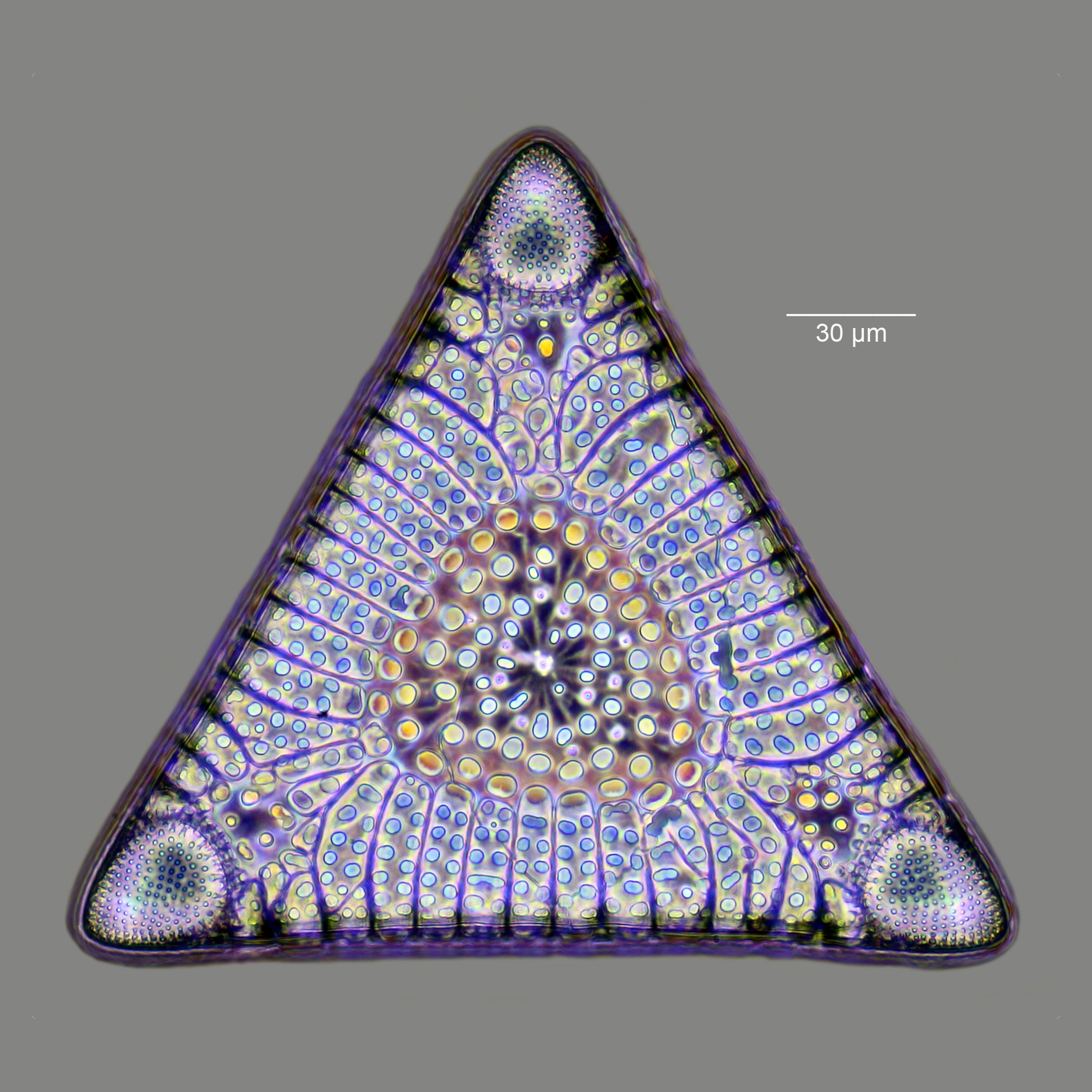
Fossil diatom frustule from 32 to 40 mya

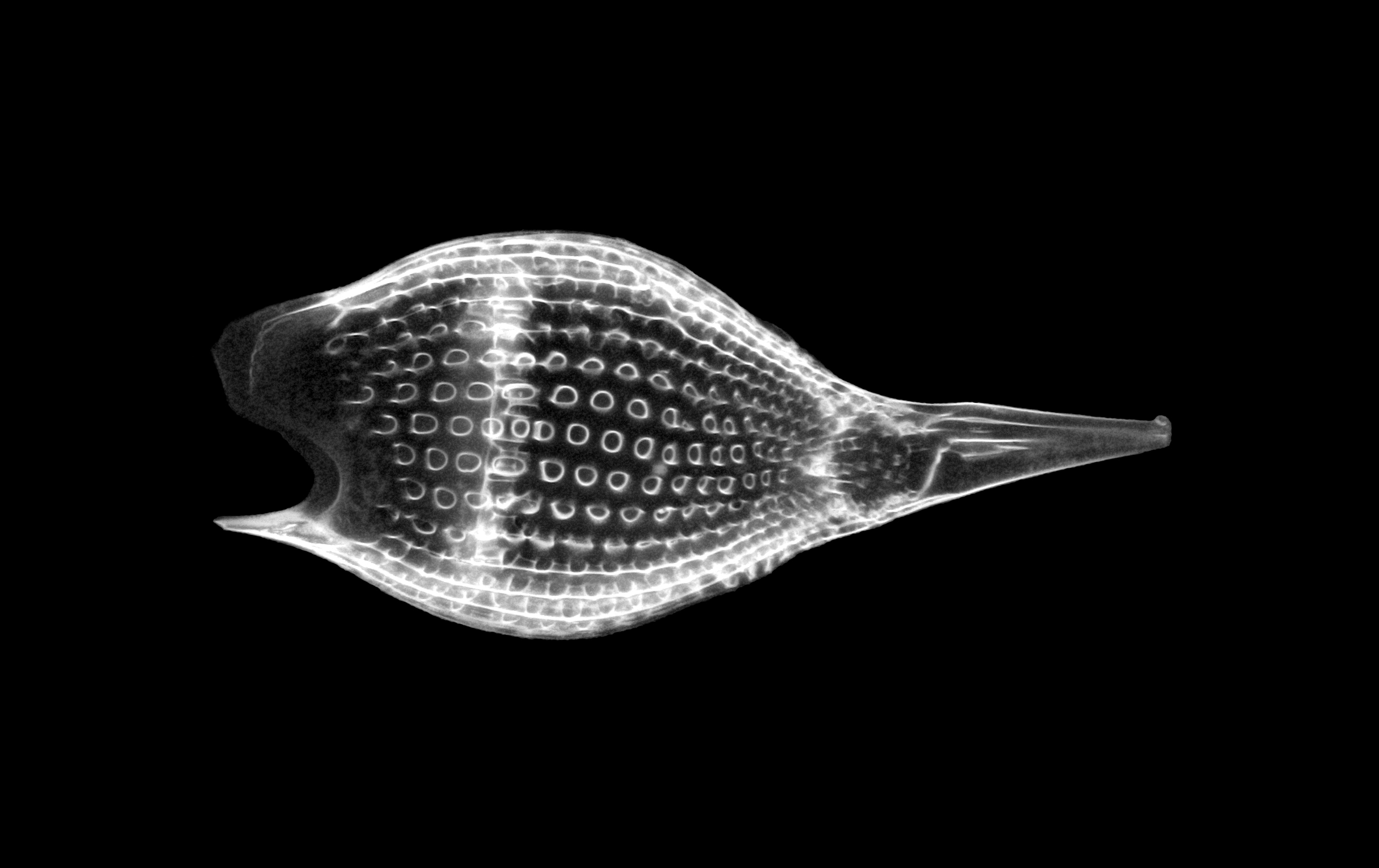
Radiolarian

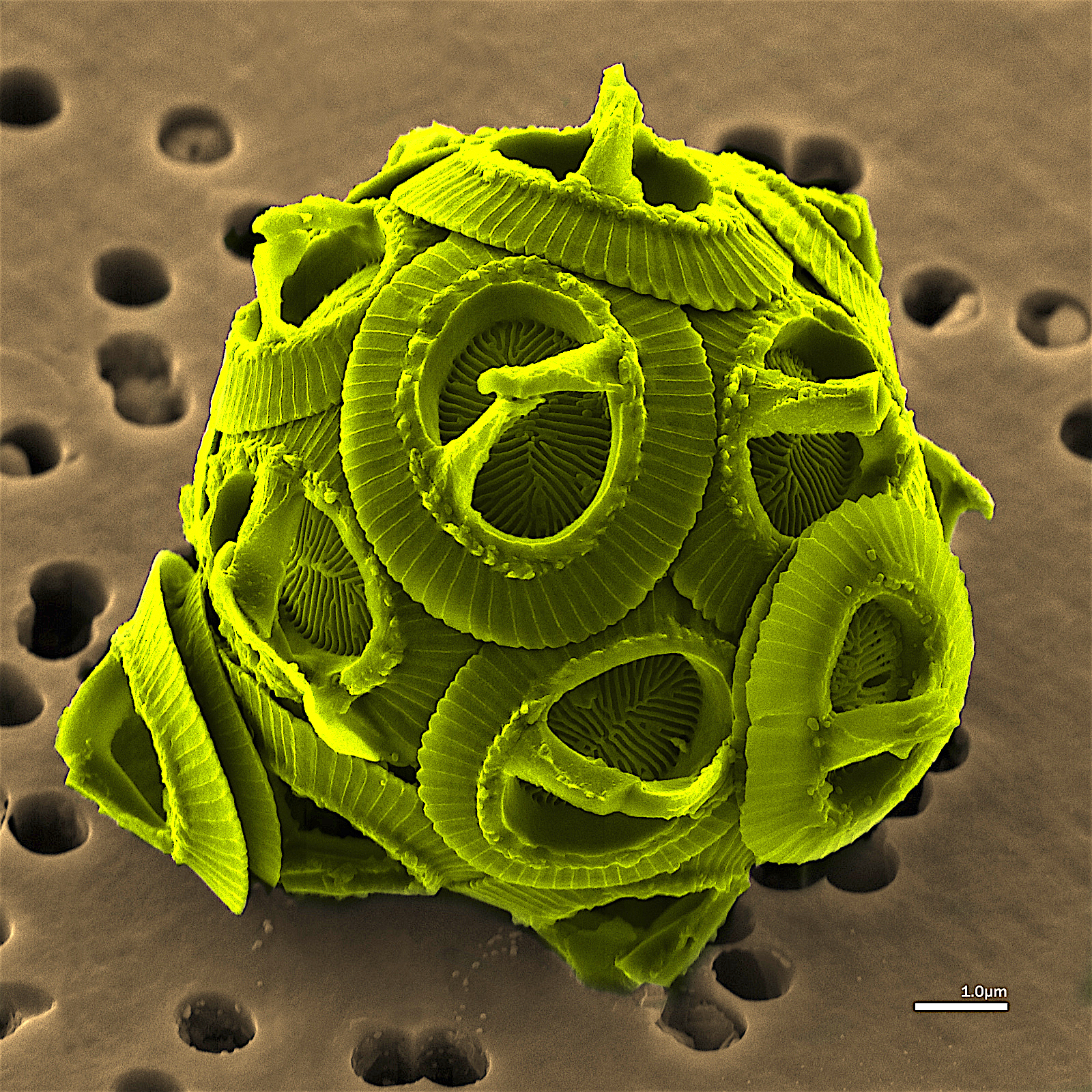
Single-celled alga, Gephyrocapsa oceanica

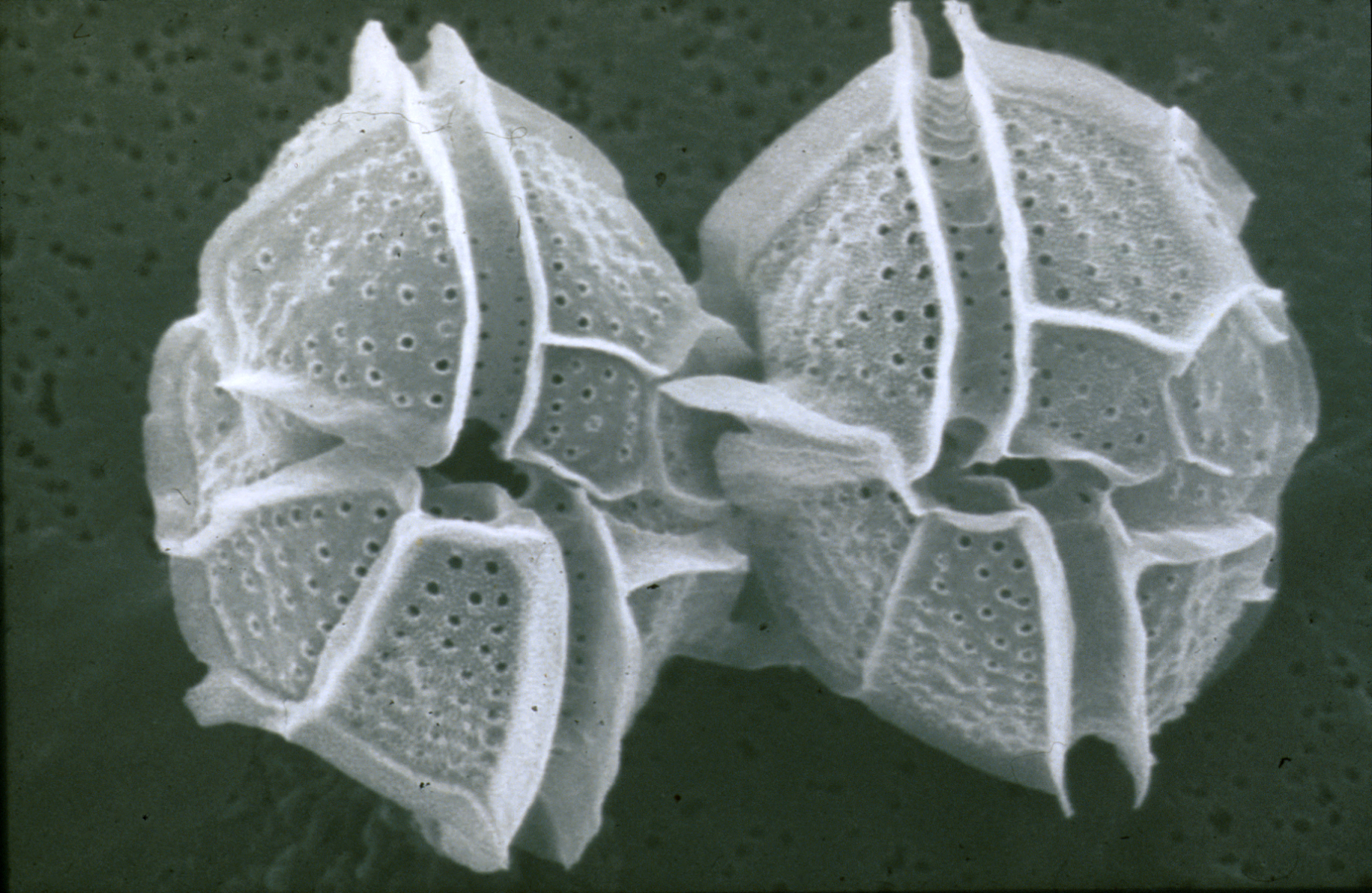
Two dinoflagellates

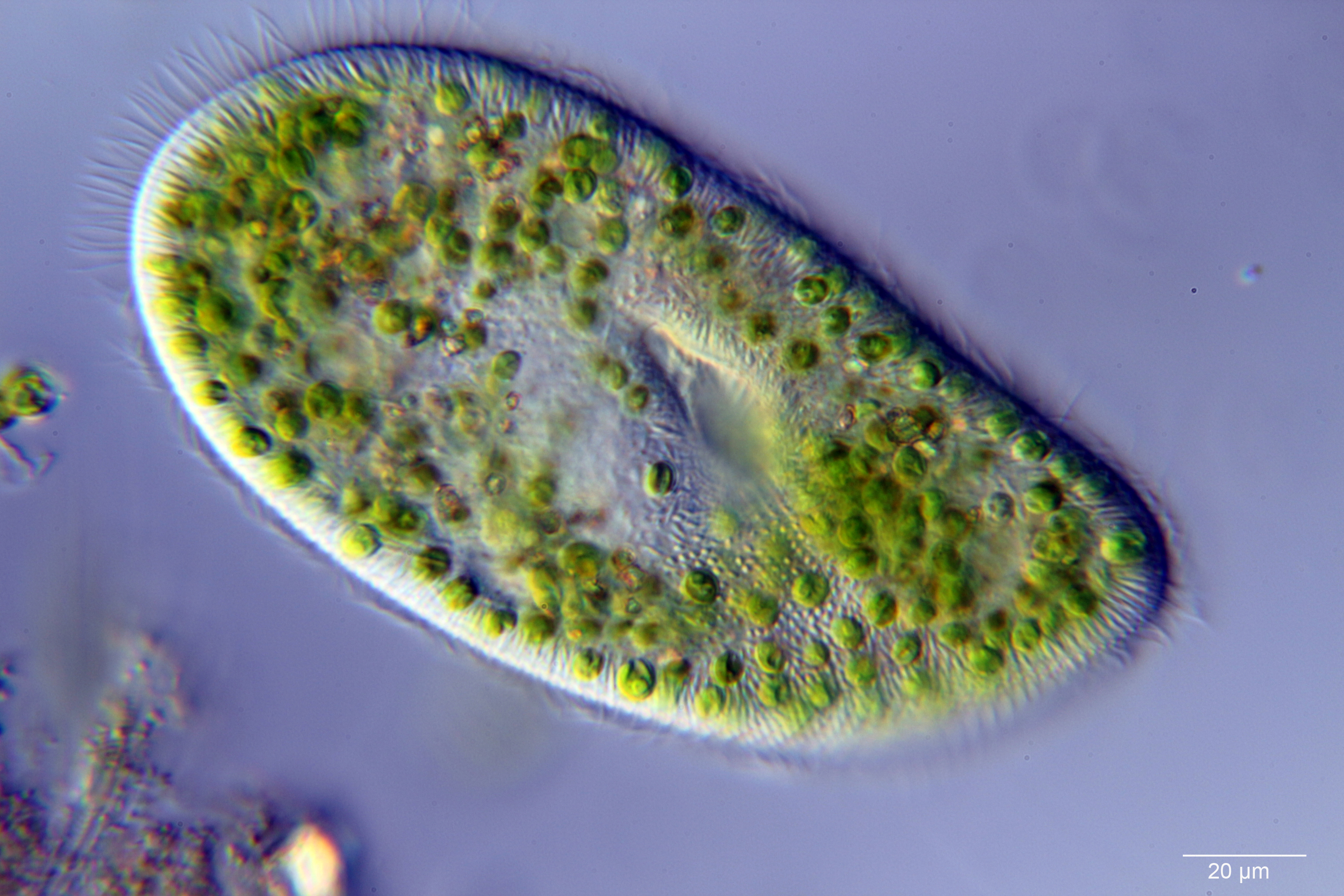
A single-celled ciliate with green zoochlorellae living inside endosymbiotically

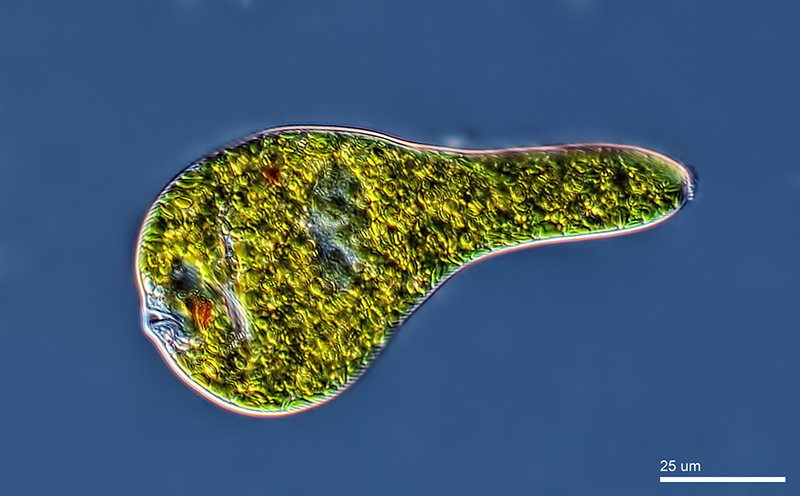
Euglenoid

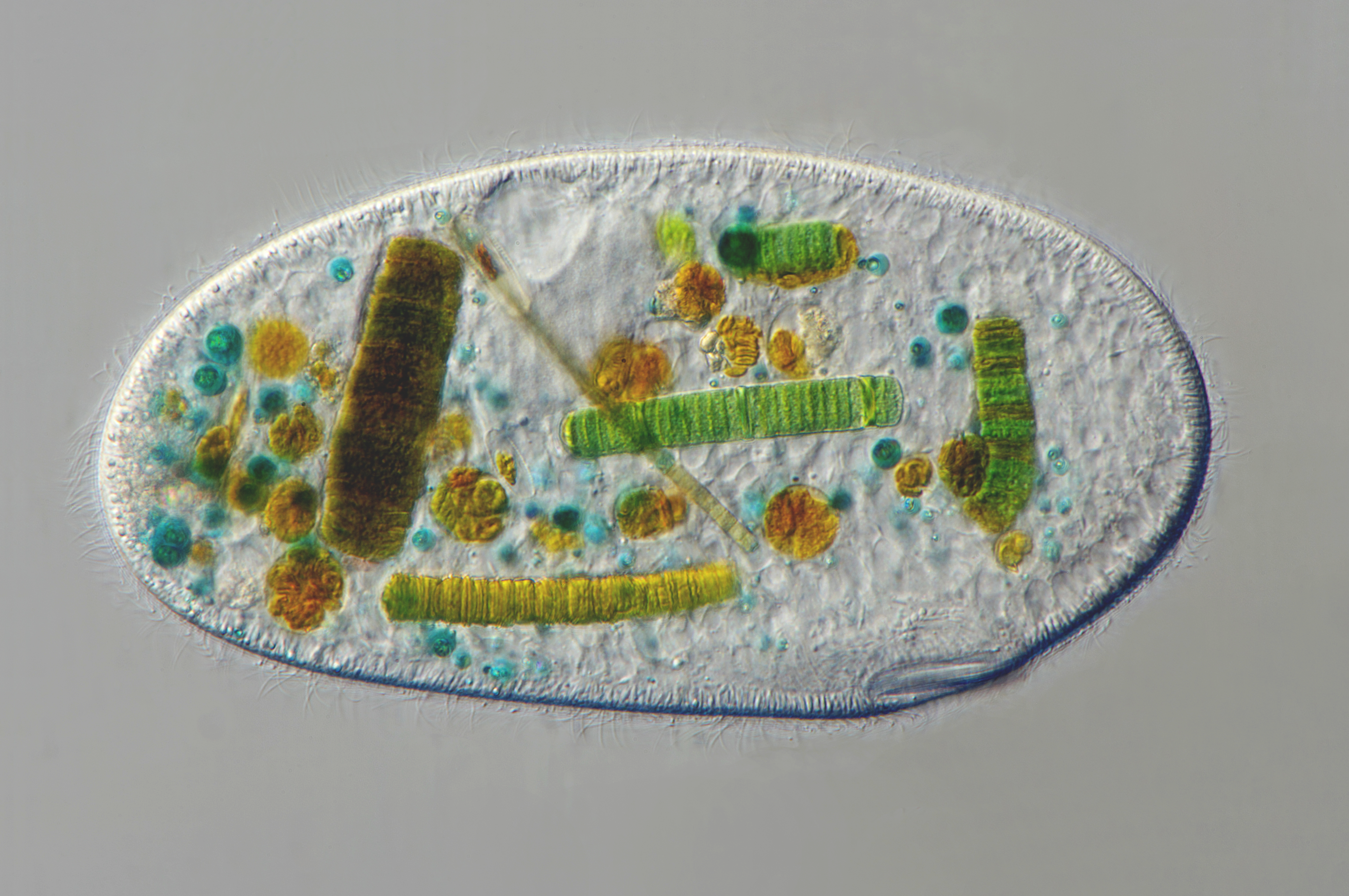
This ciliate is digesting cyanobacteria. The cytostome or mouth is at the bottom right.

External videos
- How microscopic hunters get their lunch
- Euglenoids: Single-celled shapeshifters
- How do protozoans get around?

Ciliate ingesting a diatom

Amoeba engulfing a diatom

The fungus-like protist saprobes are specialized to absorb nutrients from nonliving organic matter, such as dead organisms or their wastes. For instance, many types of oomycetes grow on dead animals or algae. Marine saprobic protists have the essential function of returning inorganic nutrients to the water. This process allows for new algal growth, which in turn generates sustenance for other organisms along the food chain. Indeed, without saprobe species, such as protists, fungi, and bacteria, life would cease to exist as all organic carbon became "tied up" in dead organisms.

== Mixotrophs ==
Mixotrophic radiolarians

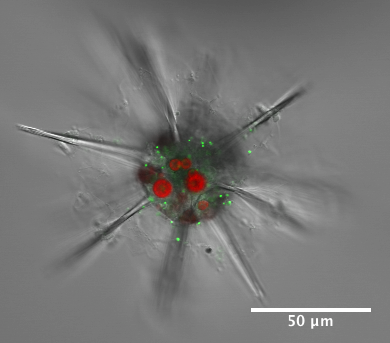
Acantharian radiolarian hosts Phaeocystis symbionts.

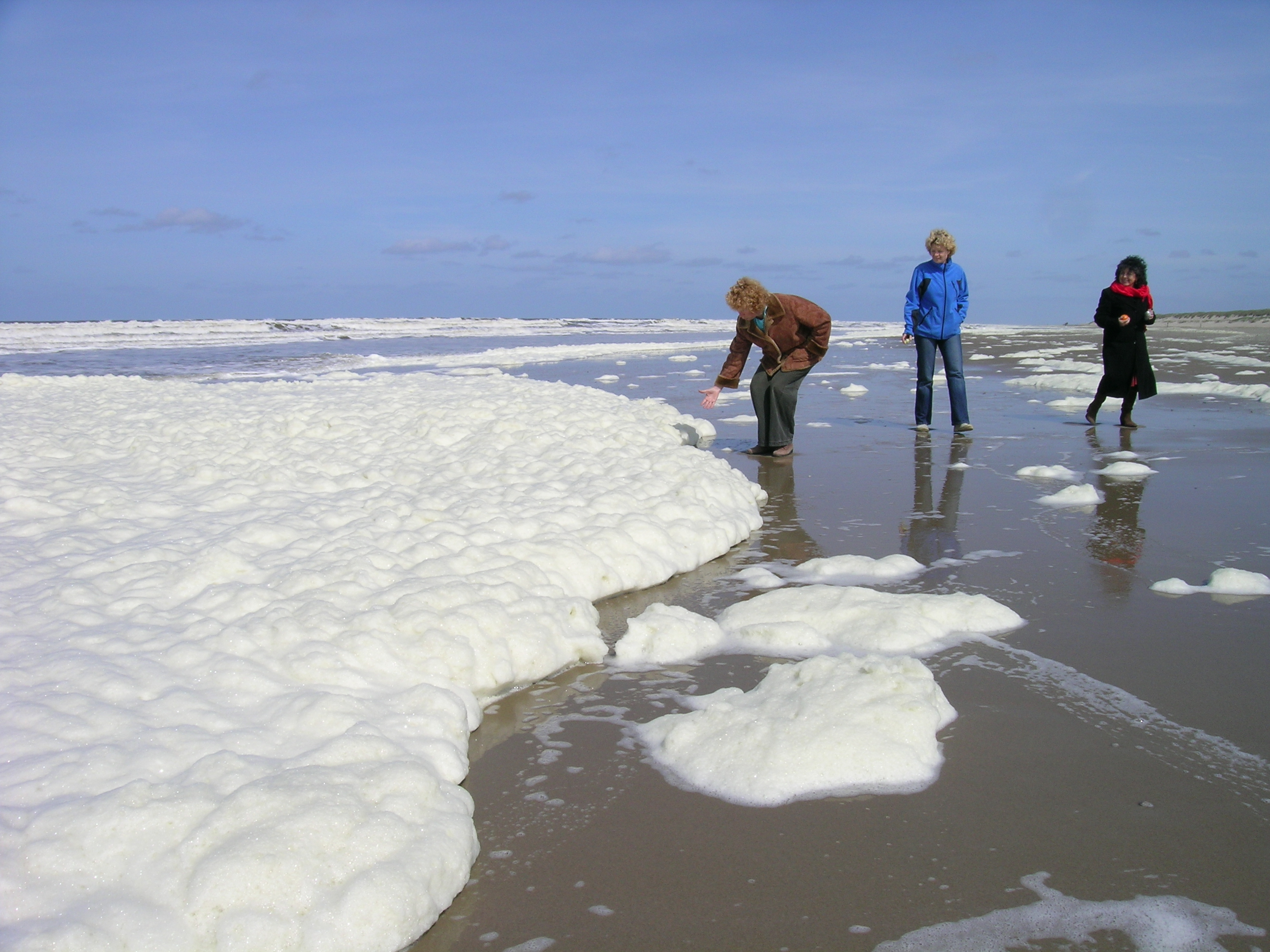
White Phaeocystis algal foam washing up on a beach

Mixotrophs have no single trophic mode. A mixotroph is an organism that can use a mix of different sources of energy and carbon, instead of having a single trophic mode on the continuum from complete autotrophy at one end to heterotrophy at the other. It is estimated that mixotrophs comprise more than half of all microscopic plankton. There are two types of eukaryotic mixotrophs: those with their own chloroplasts, and those with endosymbionts—and others that acquire them through kleptoplasty or by enslaving the entire phototrophic cell.

The distinction between plants and animals often breaks down in very small organisms. Possible combinations are photo- and chemotrophy, litho- and organotrophy, auto- and heterotrophy or other combinations of these. Mixotrophs can be either eukaryotic or prokaryotic. They can take advantage of different environmental conditions.

Recent studies of marine microzooplankton found 30–45% of the ciliate abundance was mixotrophic, and up to 65% of the amoeboid, foram and radiolarian biomass was mixotrophic.

Phaeocystis is an important algal genus found as part of the marine phytoplankton around the world. It has a polymorphic life cycle, ranging from free-living cells to large colonies. It has the ability to form floating colonies, where hundreds of cells are embedded in a gel matrix, which can increase massively in size during blooms. As a result, Phaeocystis is an important contributor to the marine carbon and sulfur cycles. Phaeocystis species are endosymbionts to acantharian radiolarians.

Mixotrophic plankton that combine phototrophy and heterotrophy – table based on Stoecker et al., 2017
General types	Description		Example	Further examples
Bacterioplankton	Photoheterotrophic bacterioplankton		Vibrio cholerae	Roseobacter spp. Erythrobacter spp. Gammaproteobacterial clade OM60; Widespread among bacteria and archaea
Phytoplankton	Called constitutive mixotrophs by Mitra et al., 2016. Phytoplankton that eat: photosynthetic protists with inherited plastids and the capacity to ingest prey.		Ochromonas species	Ochromonas spp. Prymnesium parvum Dinoflagellate examples: Fragilidium subglobosum,Heterocapsa triquetra,Karlodinium veneficum,Neoceratium furca,Prorocentrum minimum
Zooplankton	Called nonconstitutive mixotrophs by Mitra et al., 2016. Zooplankton that are photosynthetic: microzooplankton or metazoan zooplankton that acquire phototrophy through chloroplast retention^{a} or maintenance of algal endosymbionts.			
Zooplankton	Generalists	Protists that retain chloroplasts and rarely other organelles from many algal taxa		Most oligotrich ciliates that retain plastids^{a}
Zooplankton	Specialists	1. Protists that retain chloroplasts and sometimes other organelles from one algal species or very closely related algal species	Dinophysis acuminata	Dinophysis spp. Mesodinium rubrum
Zooplankton	Specialists	2. Protists or zooplankton with algal endosymbionts of only one algal species or very closely related algal species	Noctiluca scintillans	Metazooplankton with algal endosymbionts Most mixotrophic Rhizaria (Acantharea, Polycystinea, and Foraminifera); Green Noctiluca scintillans
^{a}Chloroplast (or plastid) retention = sequestration = enslavement. Some plastid-retaining species also retain other organelles and prey cytoplasm.

Mixoplankton

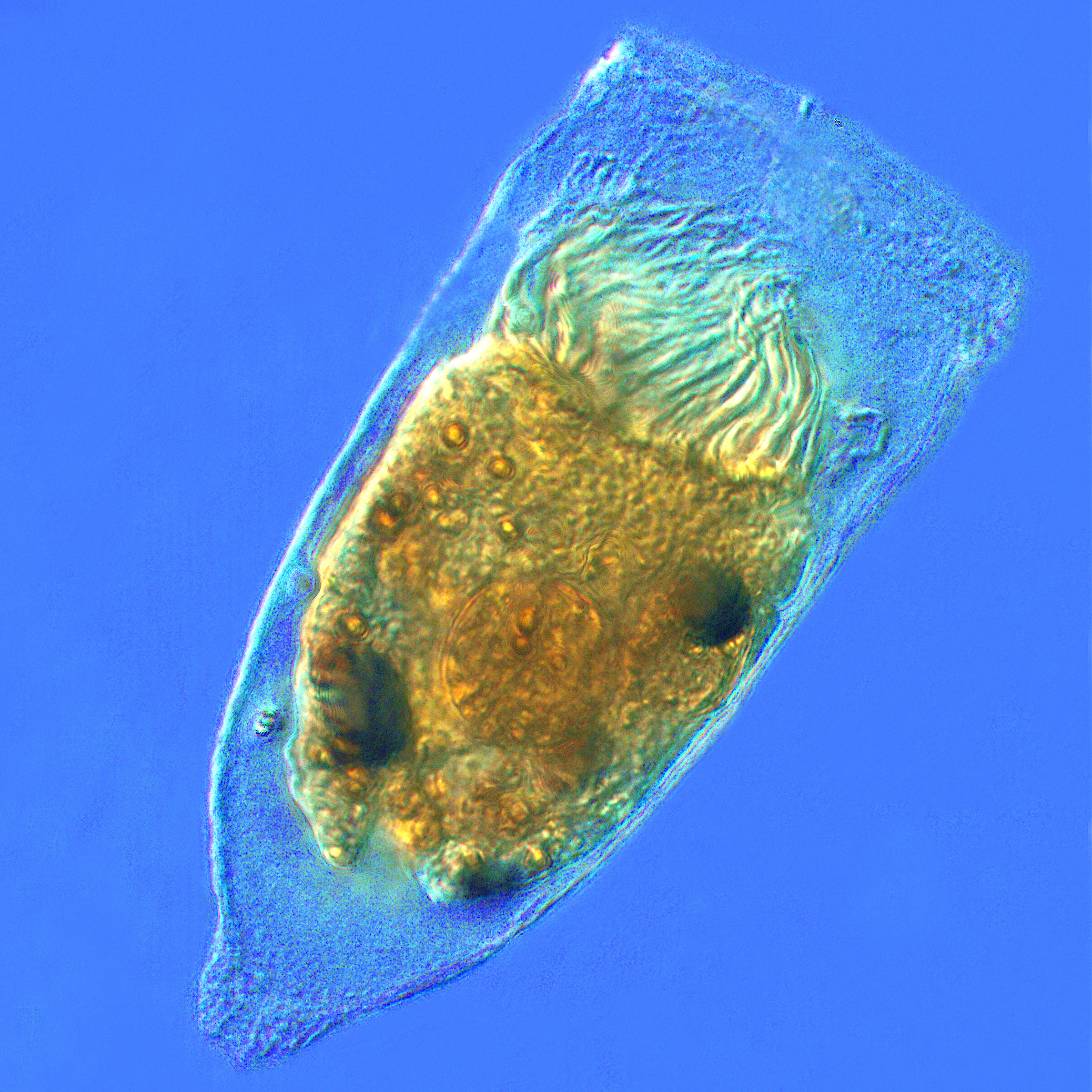
Tintinnid ciliate Favella

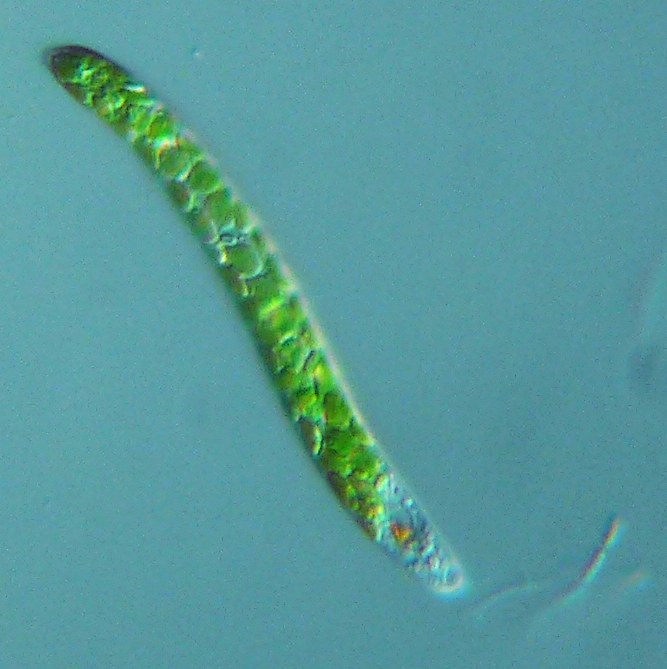
Euglena mutabilis, a photosynthetic flagellate

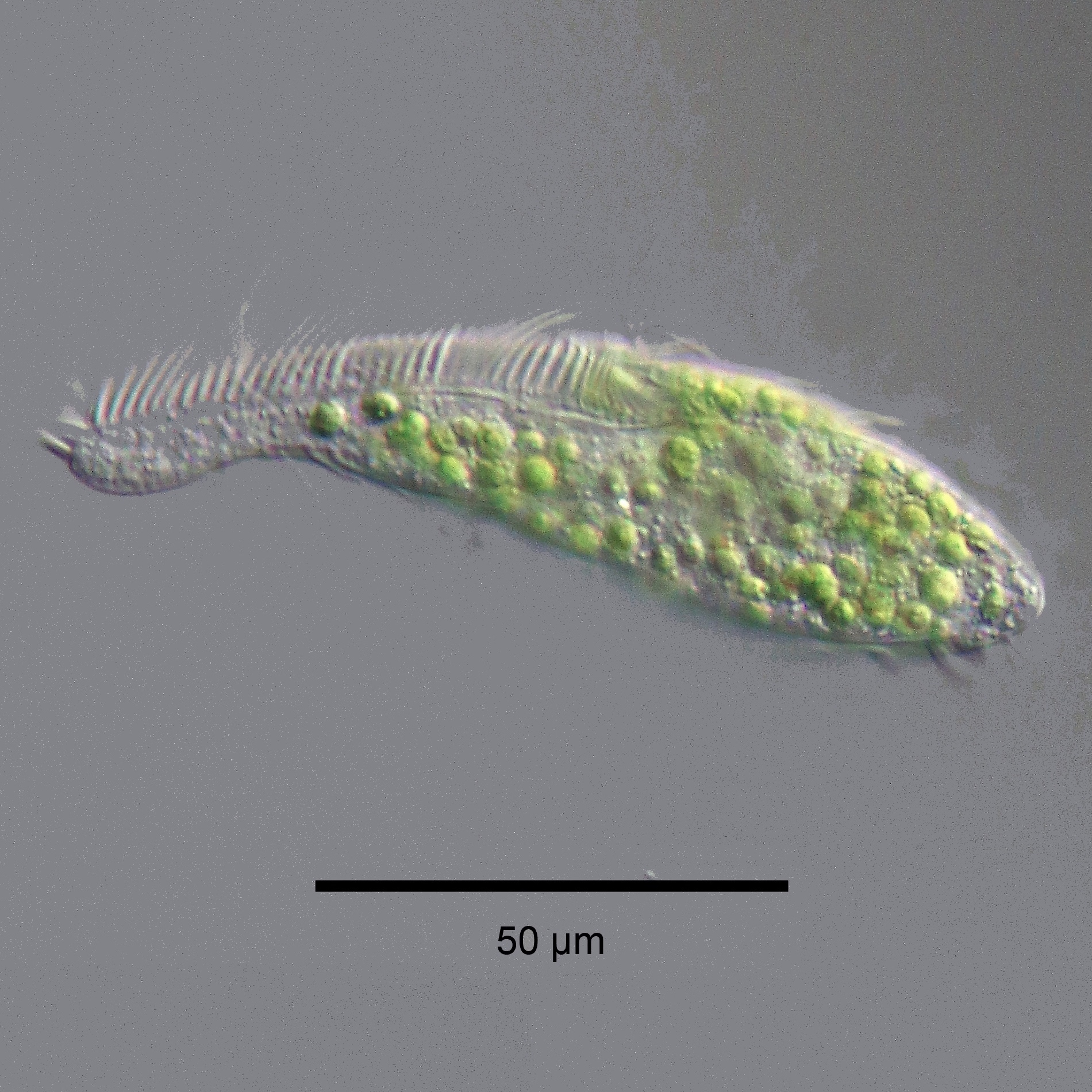
Zoochlorellae (green) living inside the ciliate Stichotricha secunda

== Protist locomotion ==
Another way of categorising protists is according to their mode of locomotion. Many unicellular protists, particularly protozoans, are motile and can generate movement using flagella, cilia or pseudopods. Cells which use flagella for movement are usually referred to as flagellates, cells which use cilia are usually referred to as ciliates, and cells which use pseudopods are usually referred to as amoeba or amoeboids. Other protists are not motile, and consequently have no movement mechanism.

Protists according to how they move
Type of protist		Movement mechanism	Description	Example	Other examples
Motile	Flagellates		A flagellum (Latin for whip) is a lash-like appendage that protrudes from the cell body of some protists (as well as some bacteria). Flagellates use from one to several flagella for locomotion and sometimes as feeding and sensory organelle.	Cryptophytes	All dinoflagellates and nanoflagellates (choanoflagellates, silicoflagellates, most green algae) (Other protists go through a phase as gametes when they have temporary flagellum – some radiolarians, foraminiferans and Apicomplexa)
Motile	Ciliates		A cilium (Latin for eyelash) is a tiny flagellum. Ciliates use multiple cilia, which can number in many hundreds, to power themselves through the water.	Paramecium bursaria click to see cilia	Foraminiferans, and some marine amoebae, ciliates and flagellates.
Motile	Amoebas (amoeboids)		Pseudopods (Greek for false feet) are lobe-like appendages which amoebas use to anchor to a solid surface and pull themselves forward. They can change their shape by extending and retracting these pseudopods.	Amoeba	Found in every major protist lineage. Amoeboid cells occur among the protozoans, but also in the algae and the fungi.
Not motile		none		Diatom	Coccolithophores, most diatoms, and non‐motile species of Phaeocystis Among protozoans the parasitic Apicomplexa are non‐motile.

Difference of beating pattern of flagellum and cilium

Flagella are used in prokaryotes (archaea and bacteria) as well as protists. In addition, both flagella and cilia are widely used in eukaryotic cells (plant and animal) apart from protists.

The regular beat patterns of eukaryotic cilia and flagella generates motion on a cellular level. Examples range from the propulsion of single cells such as the swimming of spermatozoa to the transport of fluid along a stationary layer of cells such as in a respiratory tract. Though eukaryotic flagella and motile cilia are ultrastructurally identical, the beating pattern of the two organelles can be different. In the case of flagella, the motion is often planar and wave-like, whereas the motile cilia often perform a more complicated three-dimensional motion with a power and recovery stroke.

Eukaryotic flagella—those of animal, plant, and protist cells—are complex cellular projections that lash back and forth. Eukaryotic flagella are classed along with eukaryotic motile cilia as undulipodia to emphasize their distinctive wavy appendage role in cellular function or motility. Primary cilia are immotile, and are not undulipodia.

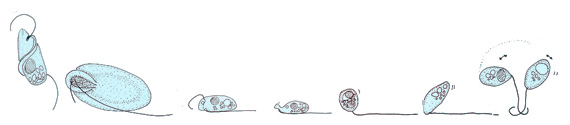
Marine flagellates from the genera (left to right) Cryptaulax, Abollifer, Bodo, Rhynchomonas, Kiitoksia, Allas, and Metromonas

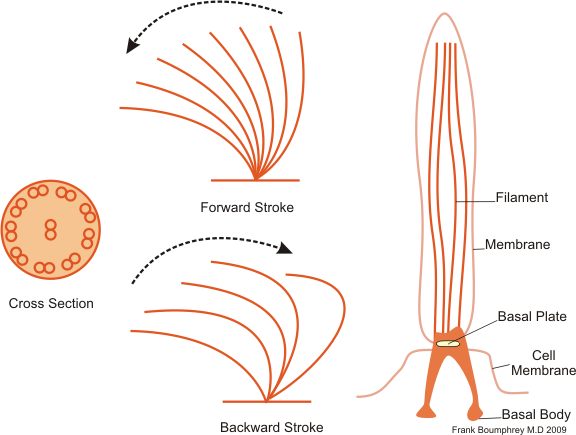
Cilia performs powerful forward strokes with a stiffened flagellum followed by relatively slow recovery movement with a relaxed flagellum.

Ciliates generally have hundreds to thousands of cilia that are densely packed together in arrays. Like the flagella, the cilia are powered by specialised molecular motors. An efficient forward stroke is made with a stiffened flagellum, followed by an inefficient backward stroke made with a relaxed flagellum. During movement, an individual cilium deforms as it uses the high-friction power strokes and the low-friction recovery strokes. Since there are multiple cilia packed together on an individual organism, they display collective behaviour in a metachronal rhythm. This means the deformation of one cilium is in phase with the deformation of its neighbor, causing deformation waves that propagate along the surface of the organism. These propagating waves of cilia are what allow the organism to use the cilia in a coordinated manner to move. A typical example of a ciliated microorganism is the Paramecium, a one-celled, ciliated protozoan covered by thousands of cilia. The cilia beating together allow the Paramecium to propel through the water at speeds of 500 micrometers per second.

Flagellate, ciliates and amoeba

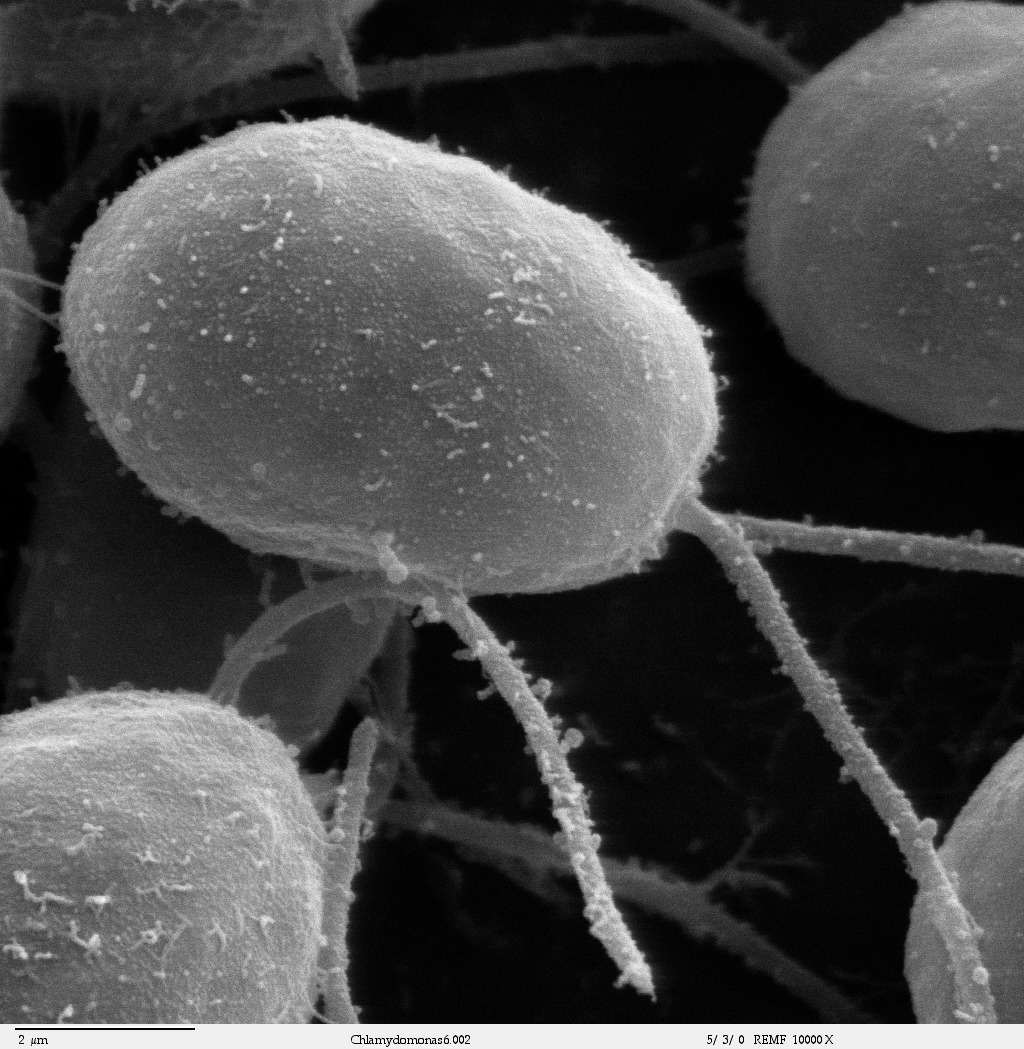
Green algal flagellate (Chlamydomonas)

Paramecium feeding on bacteria

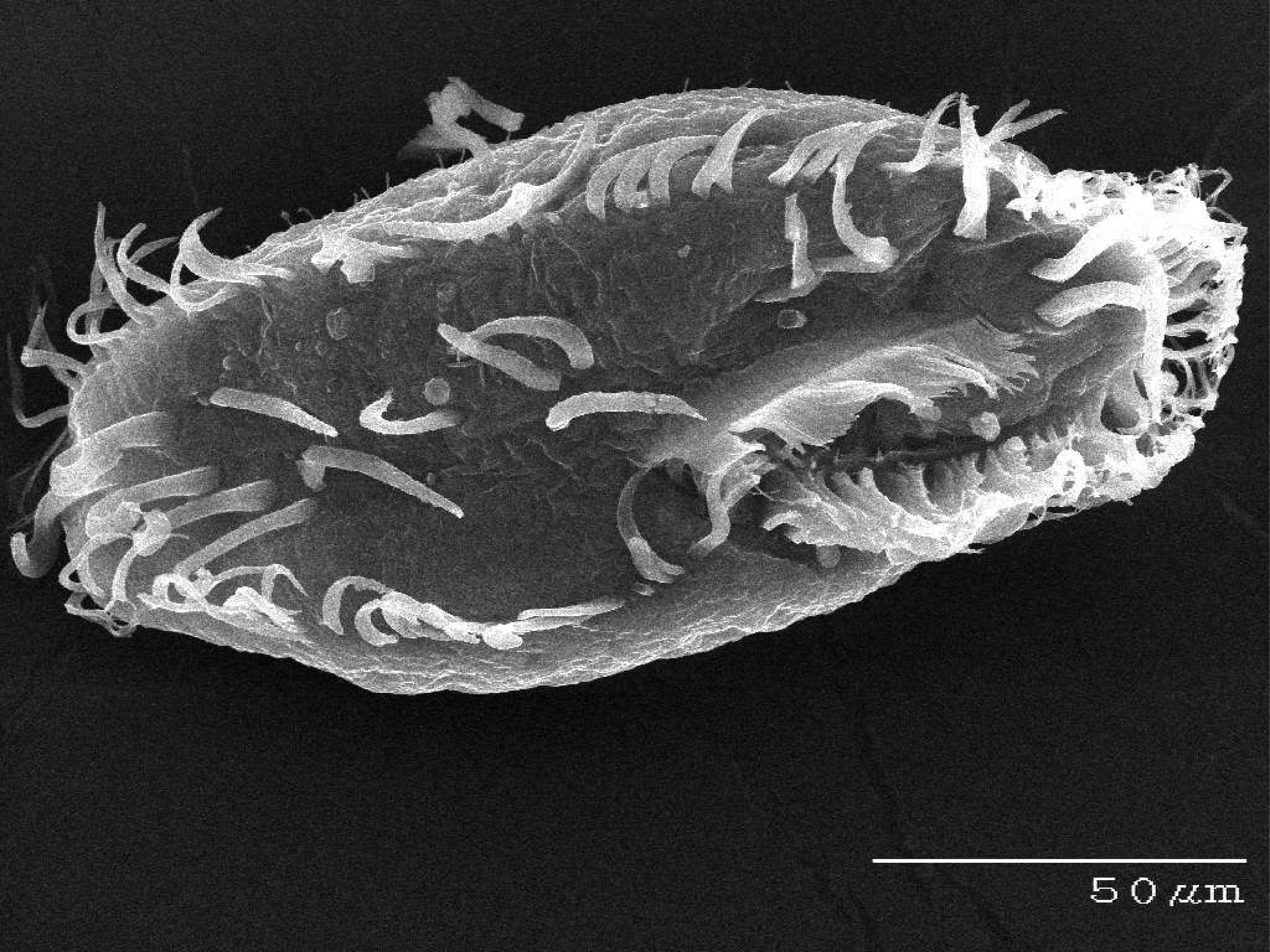
The ciliate Oxytricha trifallax with cilia clearly visible

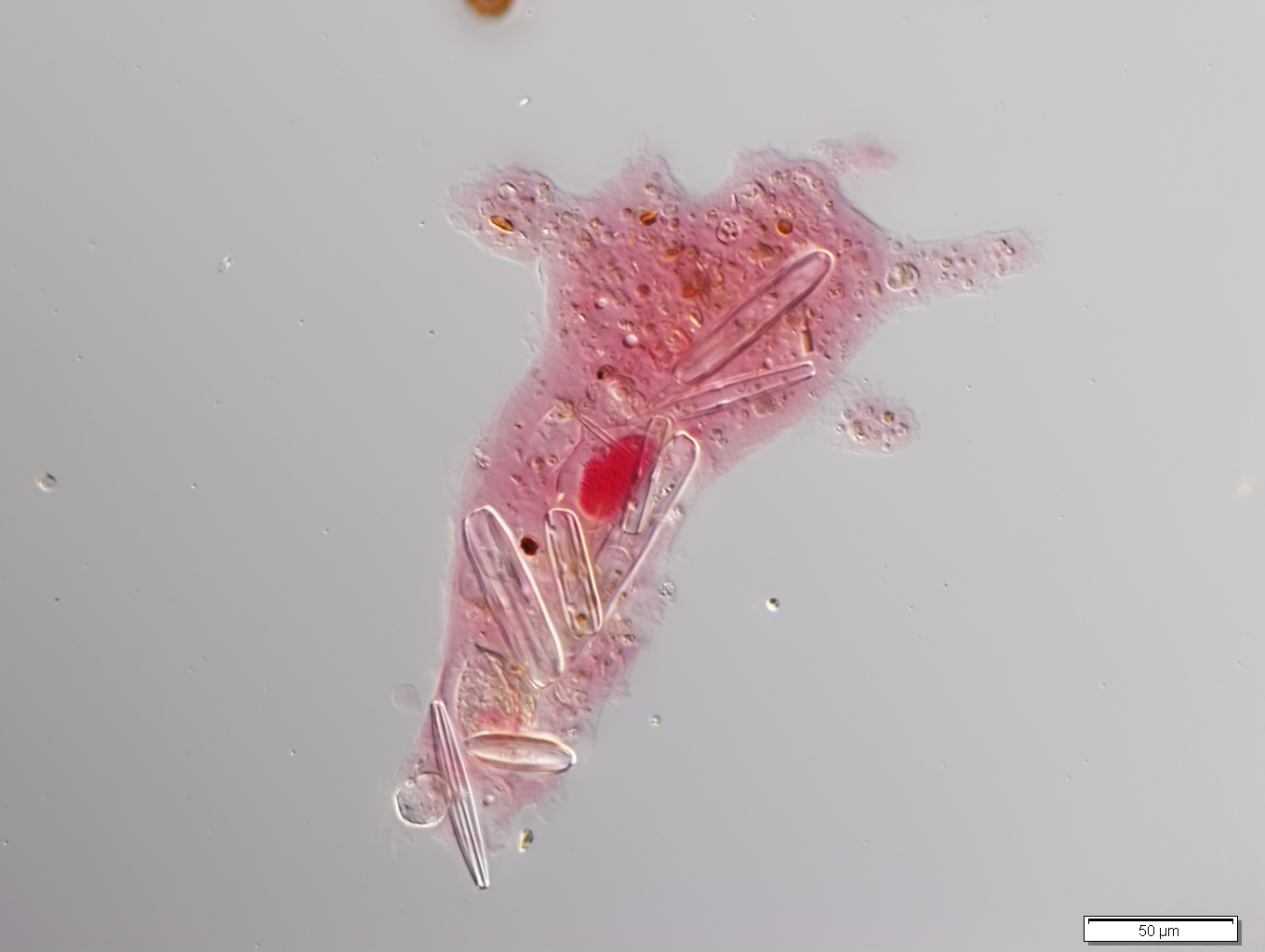
Amoeba with ingested diatoms

External videos
- Paramecium: The White Rat of Ciliates

== Marine algae ==
Algae is an informal term for a widespread and diverse group of photosynthetic protists which are not necessarily closely related and are thus polyphyletic. Marine algae can be divided into six groups: green, red and brown algae, euglenophytes, dinoflagellates and diatoms.

Dinoflagellates and diatoms are important components of marine algae and have their own sections below. Euglenophytes are a phylum of unicellular flagellates with only a few marine members.

Not all algae are microscopic. Green, red and brown algae all have multicellular macroscopic forms that make up the familiar seaweeds. Green algae, an informal group, contains about 8,000 recognised species. Many species live most of their lives as single cells or are filamentous, while others form colonies made up from long chains of cells, or are highly differentiated macroscopic seaweeds. Red algae, a (disputed) phylum contains about 7,000 recognised species, mostly multicellular and including many notable seaweeds. Brown algae form a class containing about 2,000 recognised species, mostly multicellular and including many seaweeds such as kelp. Unlike higher plants, algae lack roots, stems, or leaves. They can be classified by size as microalgae or macroalgae.

Microalgae are the microscopic types of algae, not visible to the naked eye. They are mostly unicellular species which exist as individuals or in chains or groups, though some are multicellular. Microalgae are important components of the marine protists discussed above, as well as the phytoplankton discussed below. They are very diverse. It has been estimated there are 200,000–800,000 species of which about 50,000 species have been described. Depending on the species, their sizes range from a few micrometers (μm) to a few hundred micrometers. They are specially adapted to an environment dominated by viscous forces.

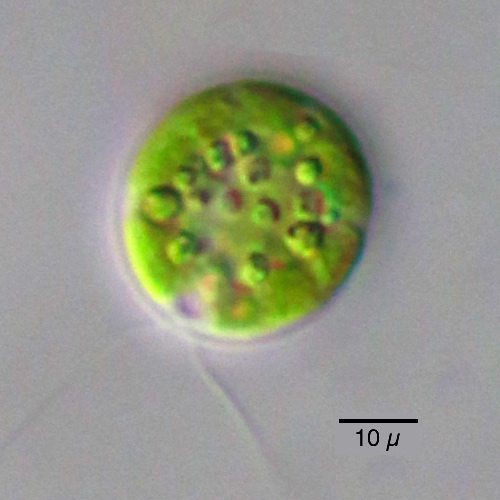
Chlamydomonas globosa, a unicellular green alga with two flagella just visible at bottom left

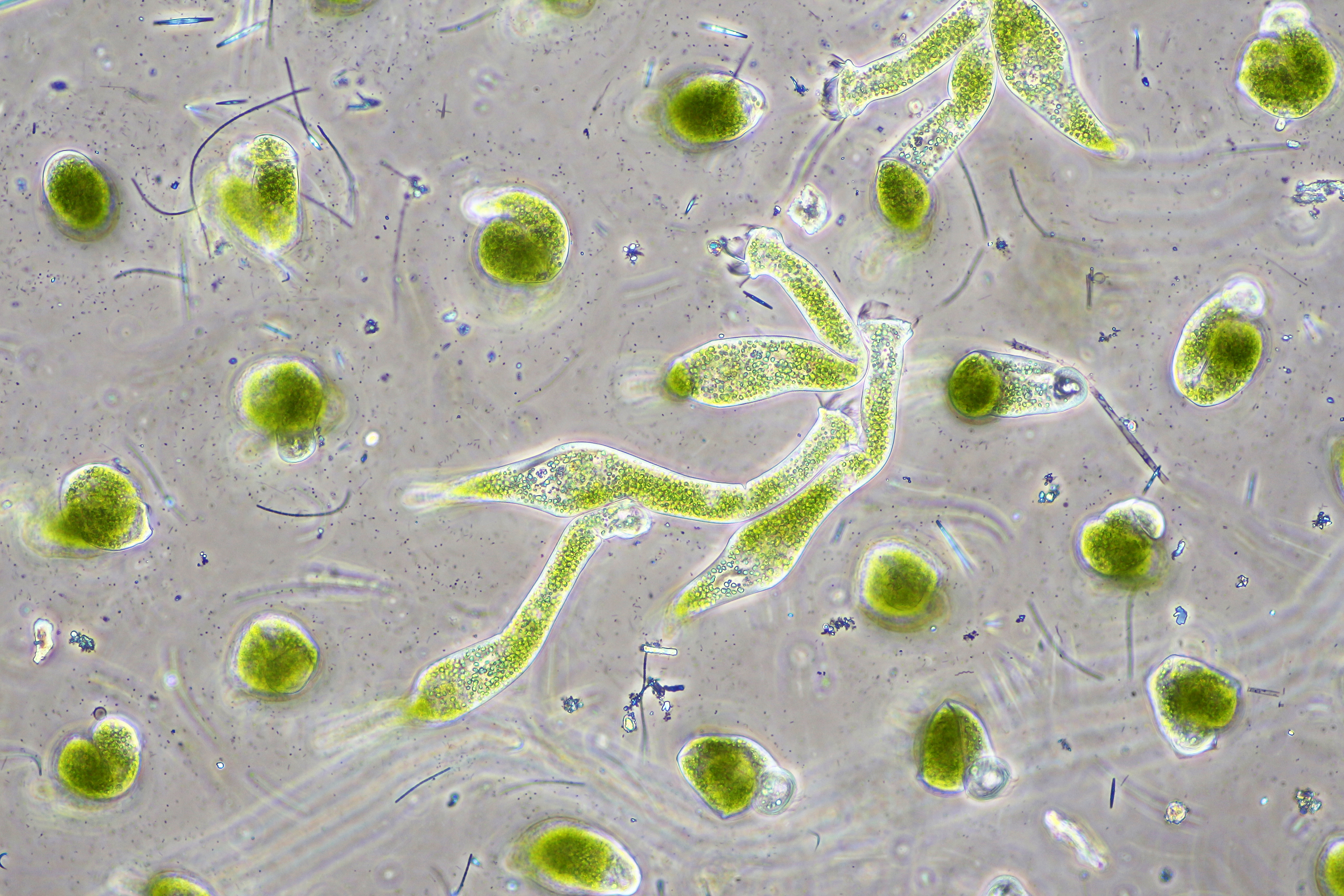
Chlorella vulgaris, a common green microalgae, in endosymbiosis with a ciliate

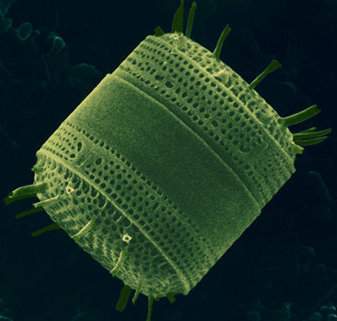
Centric diatom

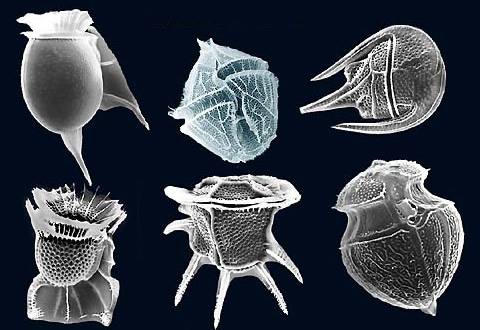
Dinoflagellates

Macroalgae are the larger, multicellular and more visible types of algae, commonly called seaweeds. Seaweeds usually grow in shallow coastal waters where they are anchored to the seafloor by a holdfast. Like microalgae, macroalgae (seaweeds) can be regarded as marine protists since they are not true plants. But they are not microorganisms, so they are not within the scope of this article.

Unicellular organisms are usually microscopic, less than one tenth of a millimeter long. There are exceptions. Mermaid's wineglass, a genus of subtropical green algae, is single-celled but remarkably large and complex in form with a single large nucleus, making it a model organism for studying cell biology. Another single-celled algae, Caulerpa taxifolia, has the appearance of a vascular plant including "leaves" arranged neatly up stalks like a fern. Selective breeding in aquariums to produce hardier strains resulted in an accidental release into the Mediterranean where it has become an invasive species known colloquially as killer algae.

=== Diatoms ===
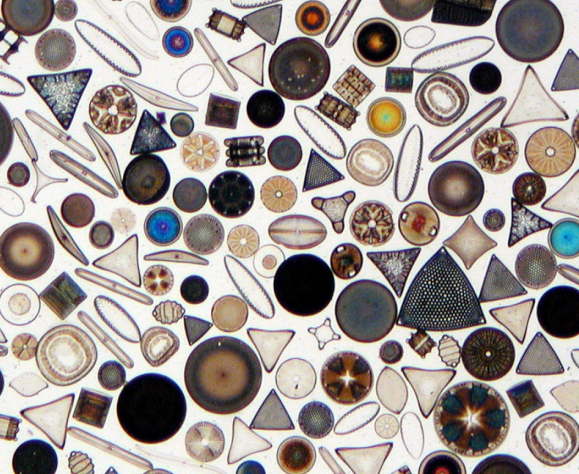
Diatoms come in many shapes and sizes.

Diatoms are photosynthetic unicellular algae populating the oceans and other waters around the globe. They form a (disputed) phylum containing about 100,000 recognised species. Diatoms generate about 20 per cent of all oxygen produced on the planet each year, and take in over 6.7 billion metric tons of silicon each year from the waters in which they live. They produce 25–45% of the total primary production of organic material in the oceans, owing to their prevalence in open-ocean regions when total phytoplankton biomass is maximal.

Diatoms are enclosed in protective silica (glass) shells called frustules. They are classified by the shape of these glass cages in which they live, and which they build as they grow. Each frustule is made from two interlocking parts covered with tiny holes through which the diatom exchanges nutrients and wastes. Dead diatoms drift to the ocean floor where, over millions of years, the remains of their frustules can build up as much as half a mile deep. Diatoms have relatively high sinking speeds compared with other phytoplankton groups, and they account for about 40% of particulate carbon exported to ocean depths.

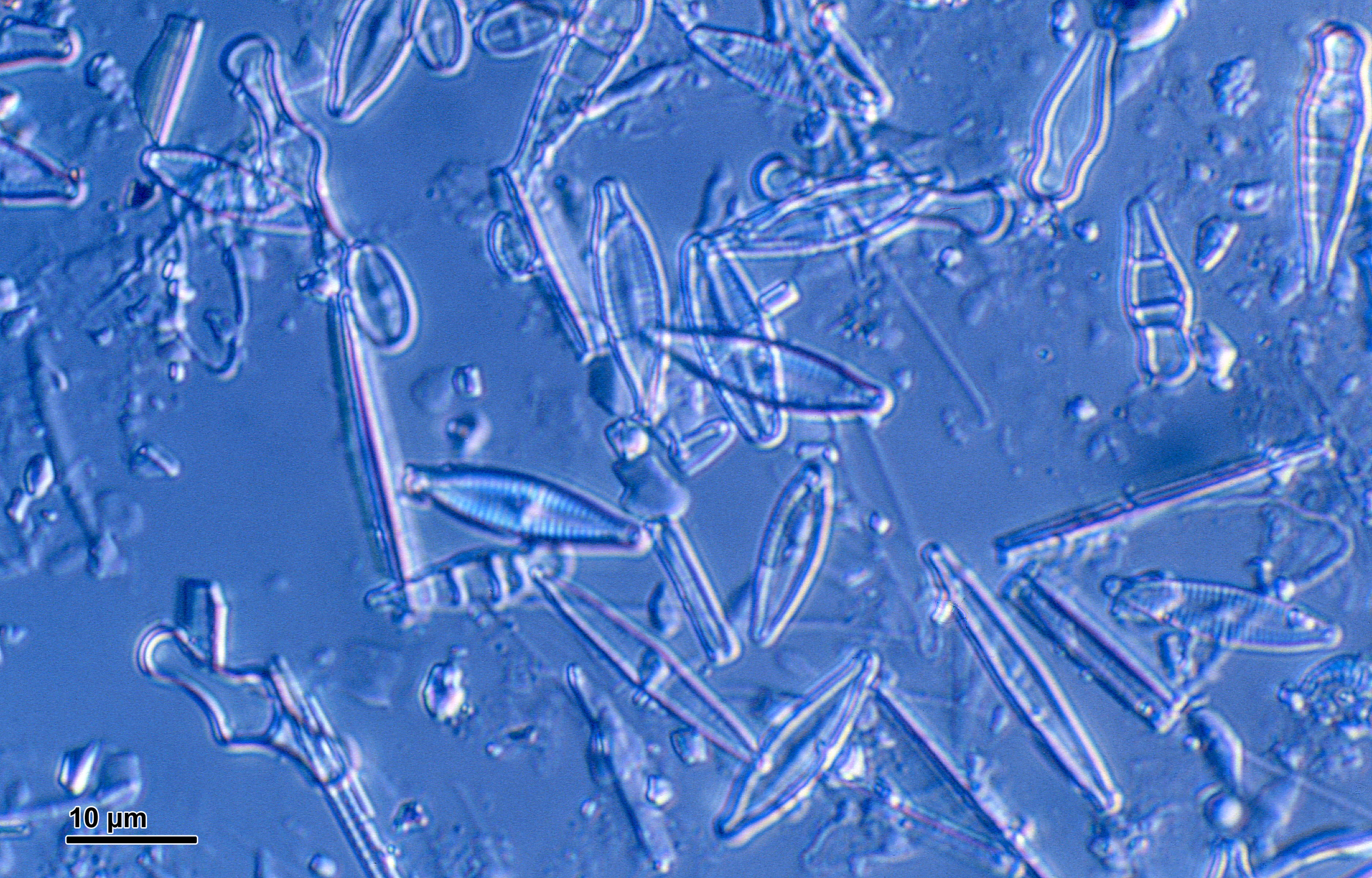
Diatoms are one of the most common types of phytoplankton.

Their protective shells (frustles) are made of silicon.

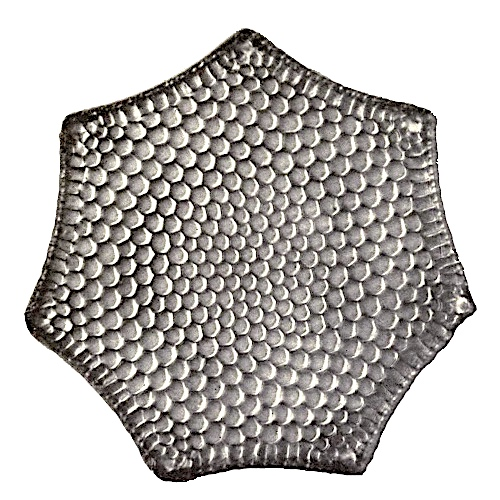

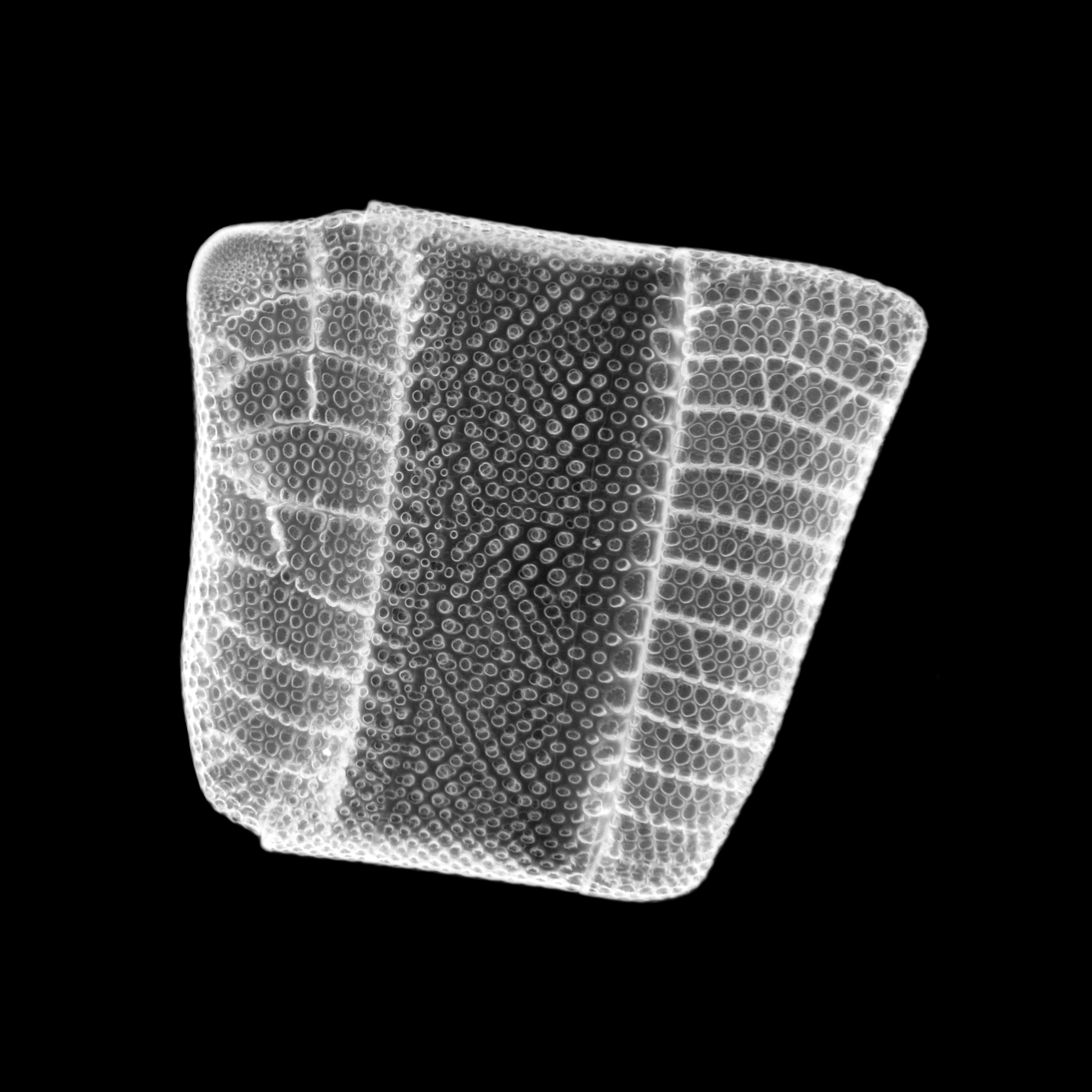
Diatom shapes
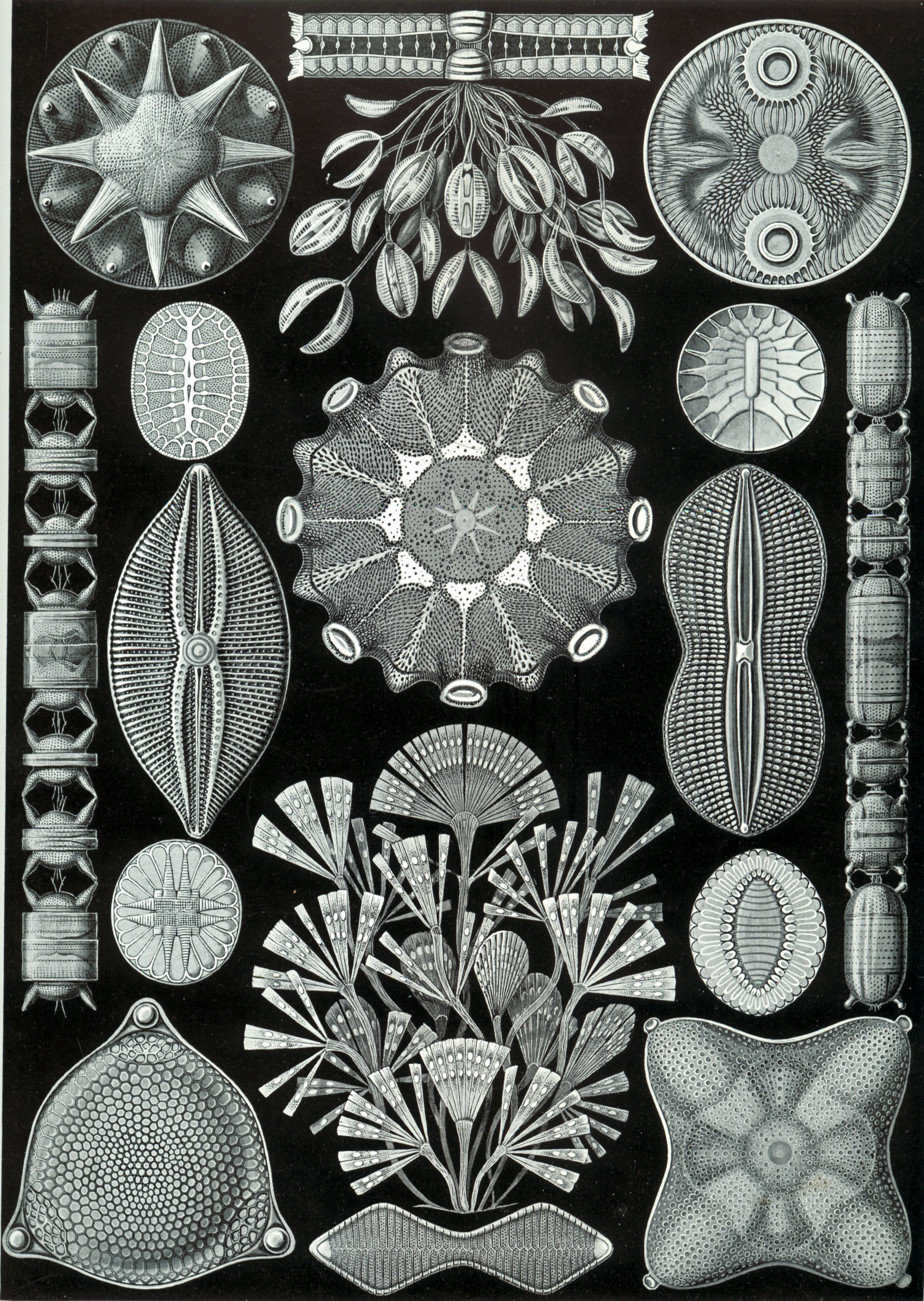
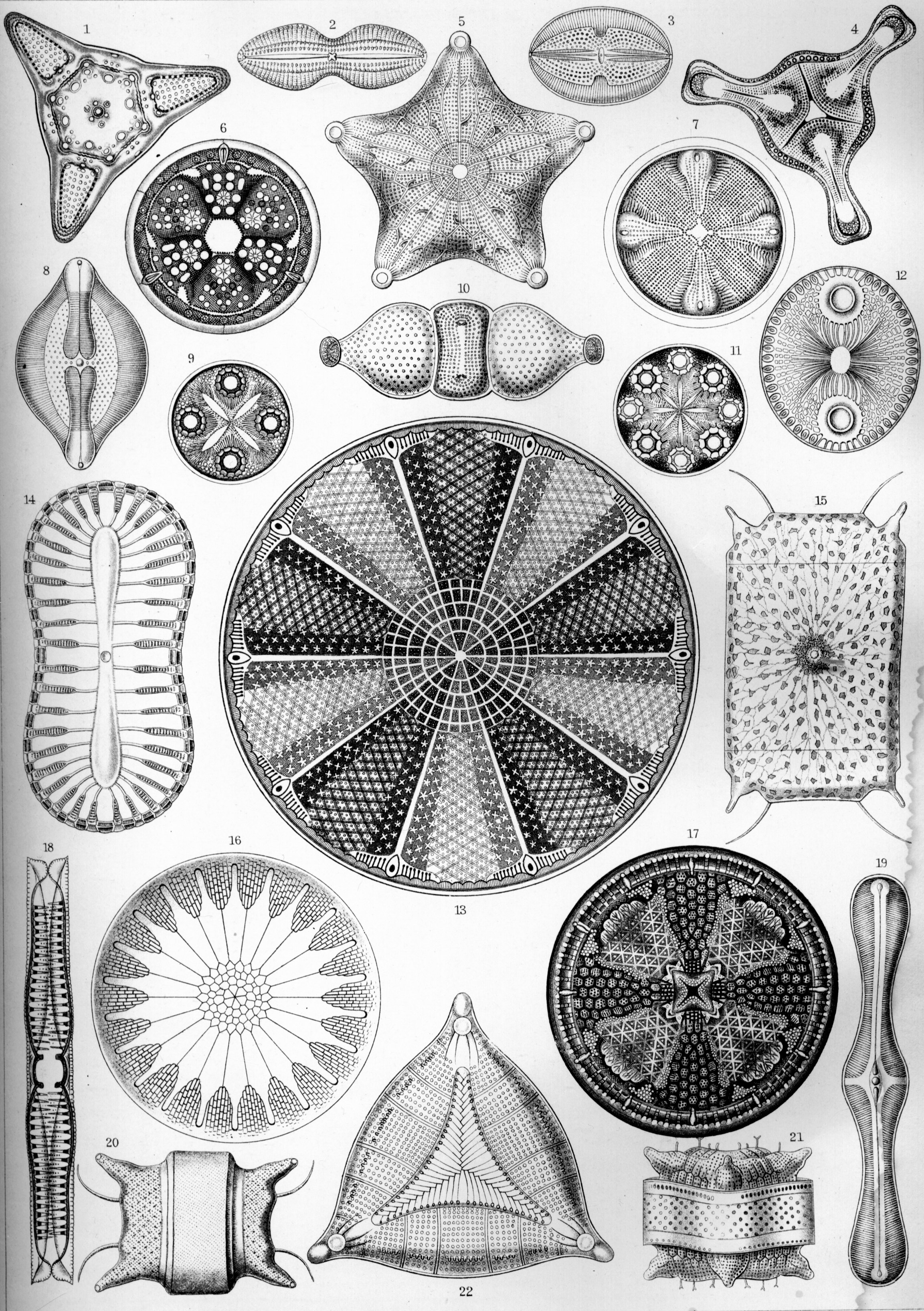
Drawings by Haeckel 1904 (click for details)
Diatoms

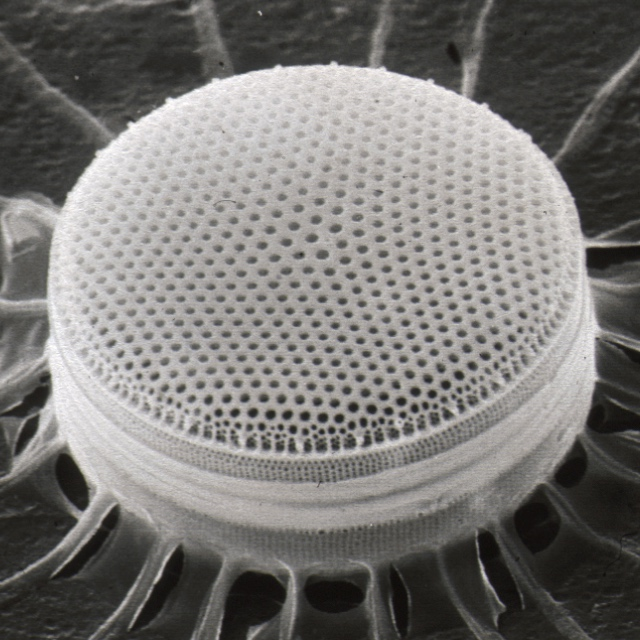
Centric

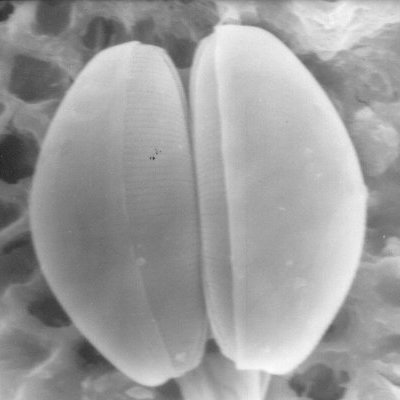
Pennate

Diatoms have a silica shell (frustule) with radial (centric) or bilateral (pennate) symmetry.

External videos
- Diatoms: Tiny factories you can see from space
- Diatom 3D interference contrast

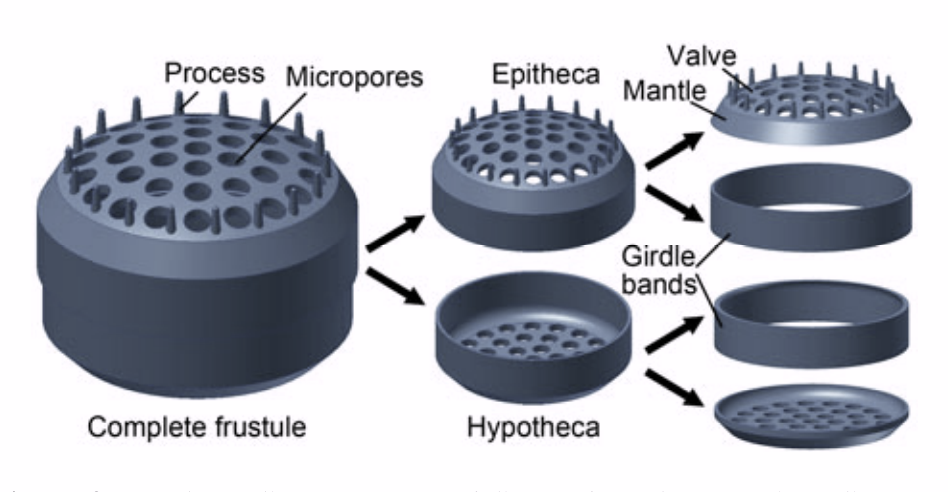
Structure of a centric diatom frustule

Physically driven seasonal enrichments in surface nutrients favour diatom blooms. Anthropogenic climate change will directly affect these seasonal cycles, changing the timing of blooms and diminishing their biomass, which will reduce primary production and CO_{2} uptake. Remote sensing data suggests there was a global decline of diatoms between 1998 and 2012, particularly in the North Pacific, associated with shallowing of the surface mixed layer and lower nutrient concentrations.

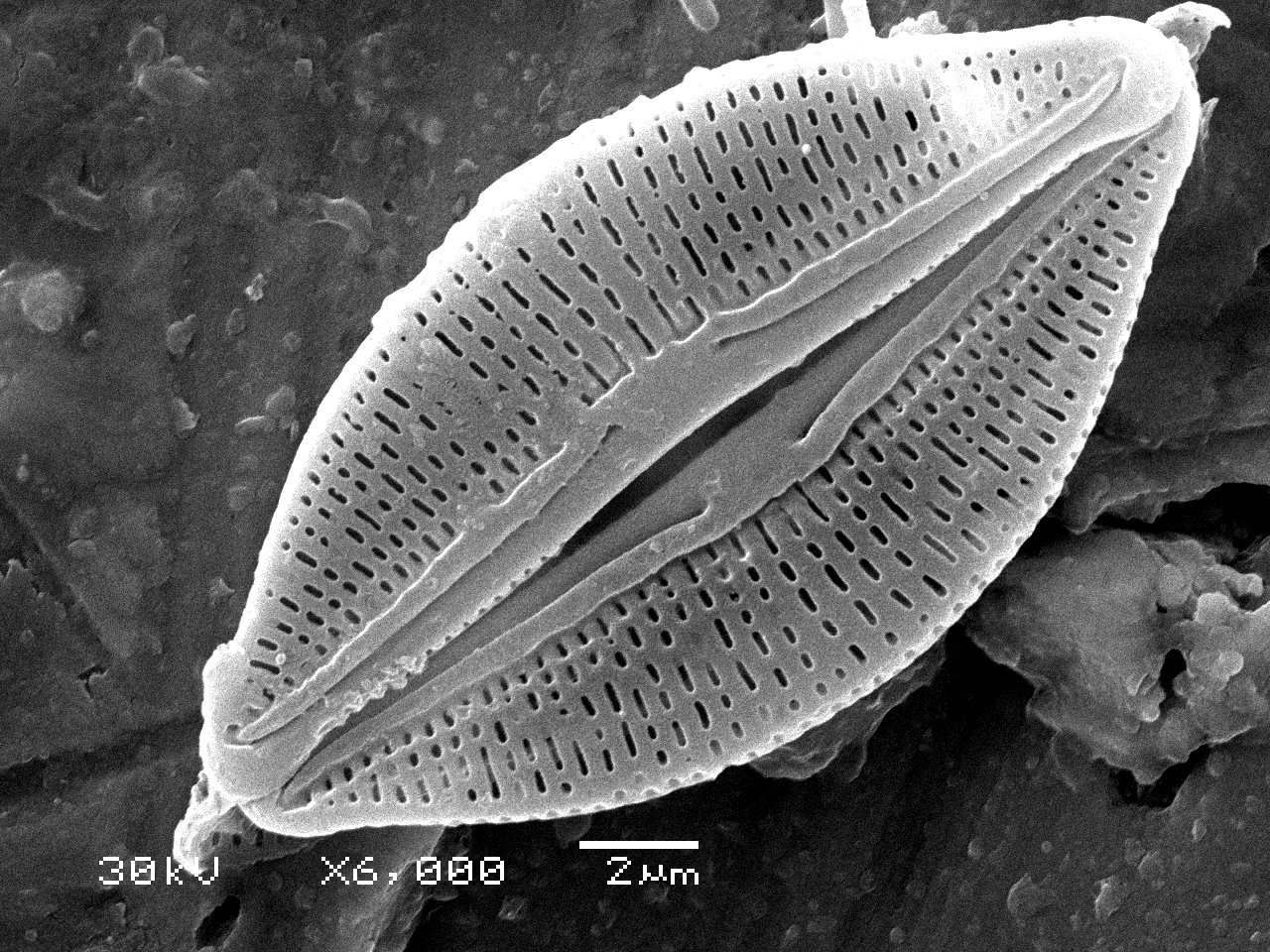
Silicified frustule of a pennate diatom with two overlapping halves

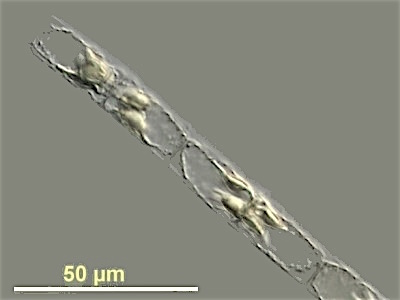
Guinardia delicatula, a diatom responsible for diatom blooms in the North Sea

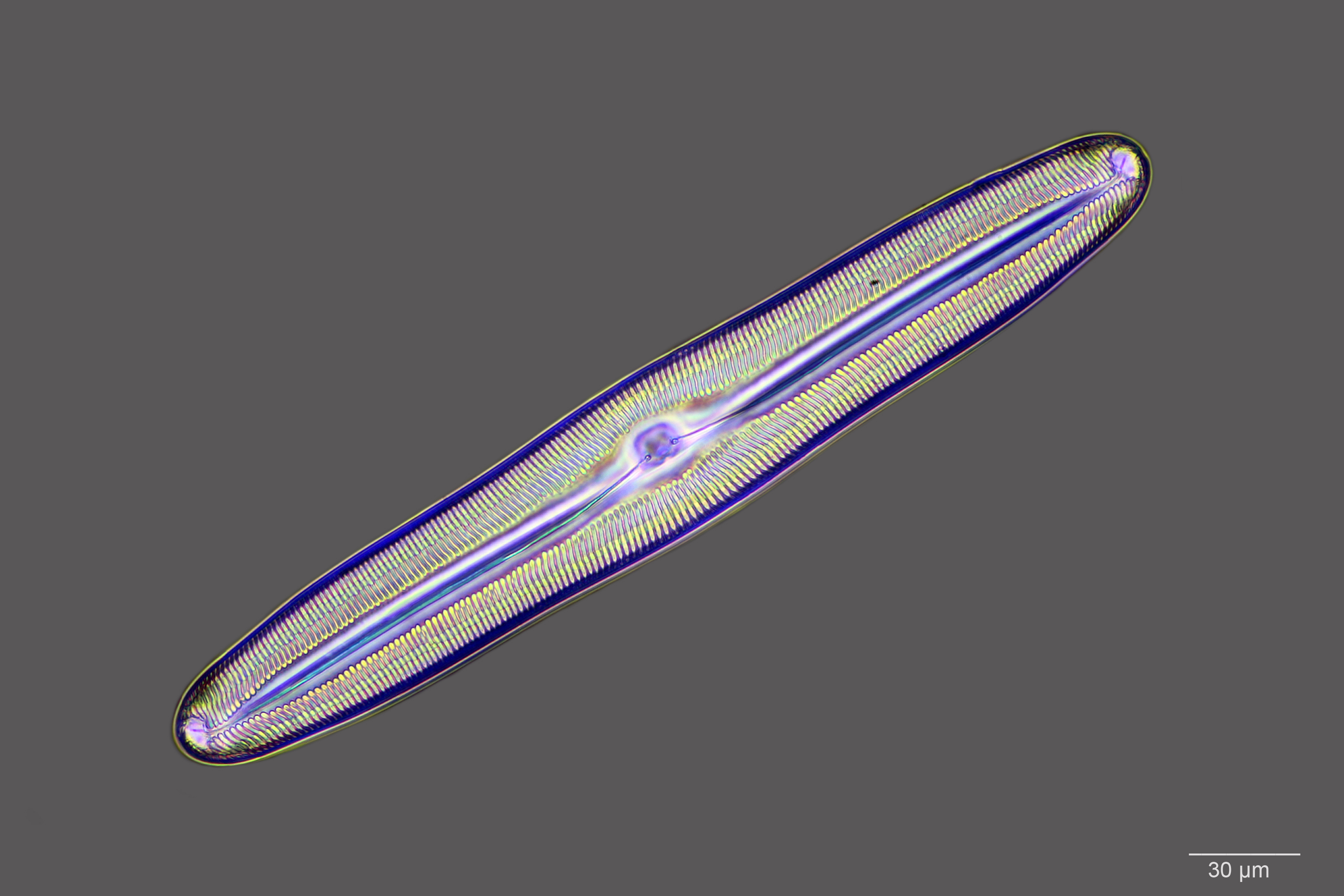
There are over 100,000 species of diatoms accounting for 25–45% of the ocean's primary production
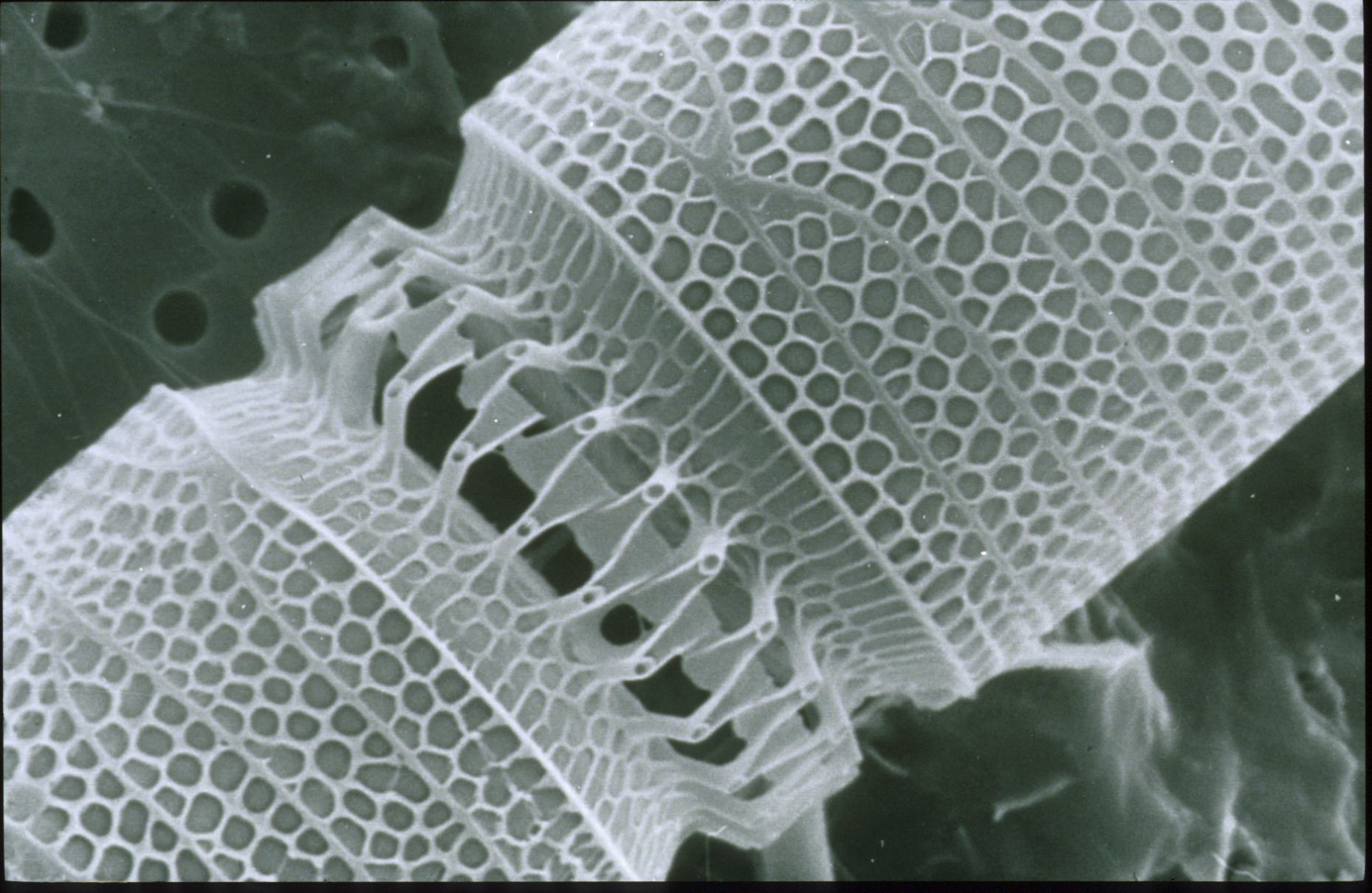
Linked diatoms

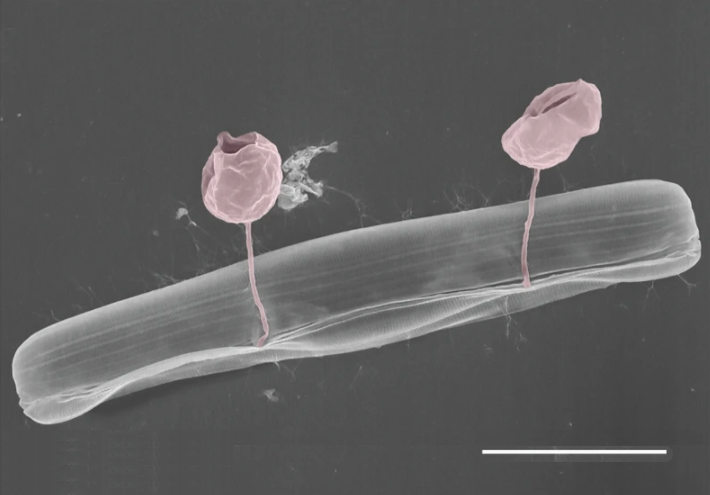
Pennate diatom from an Arctic meltpond, infected with two chytrid-like fungal pathogens. Scale bar = 10 μm.

=== Coccolithophores ===
Coccolithophores

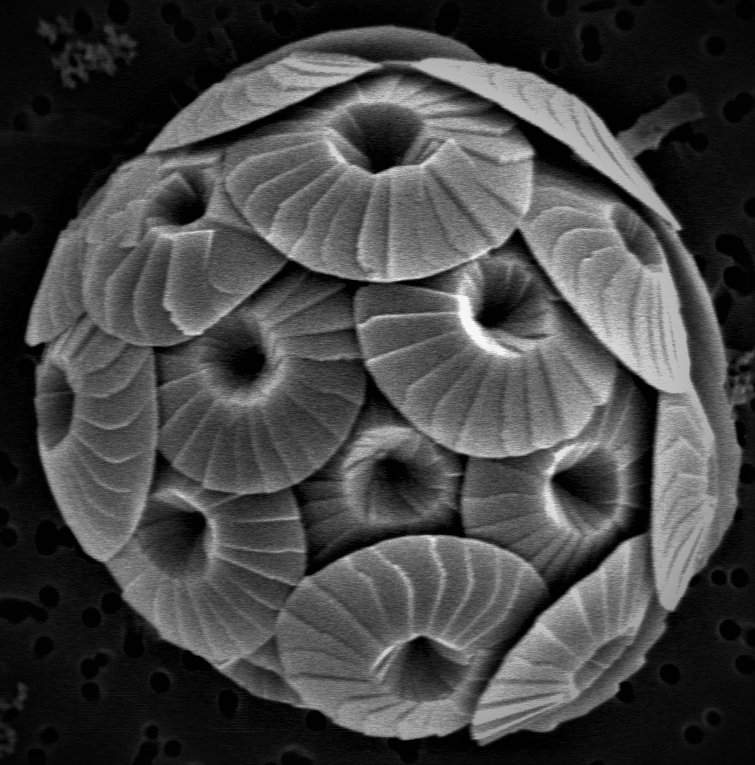
...have plates called coccoliths.

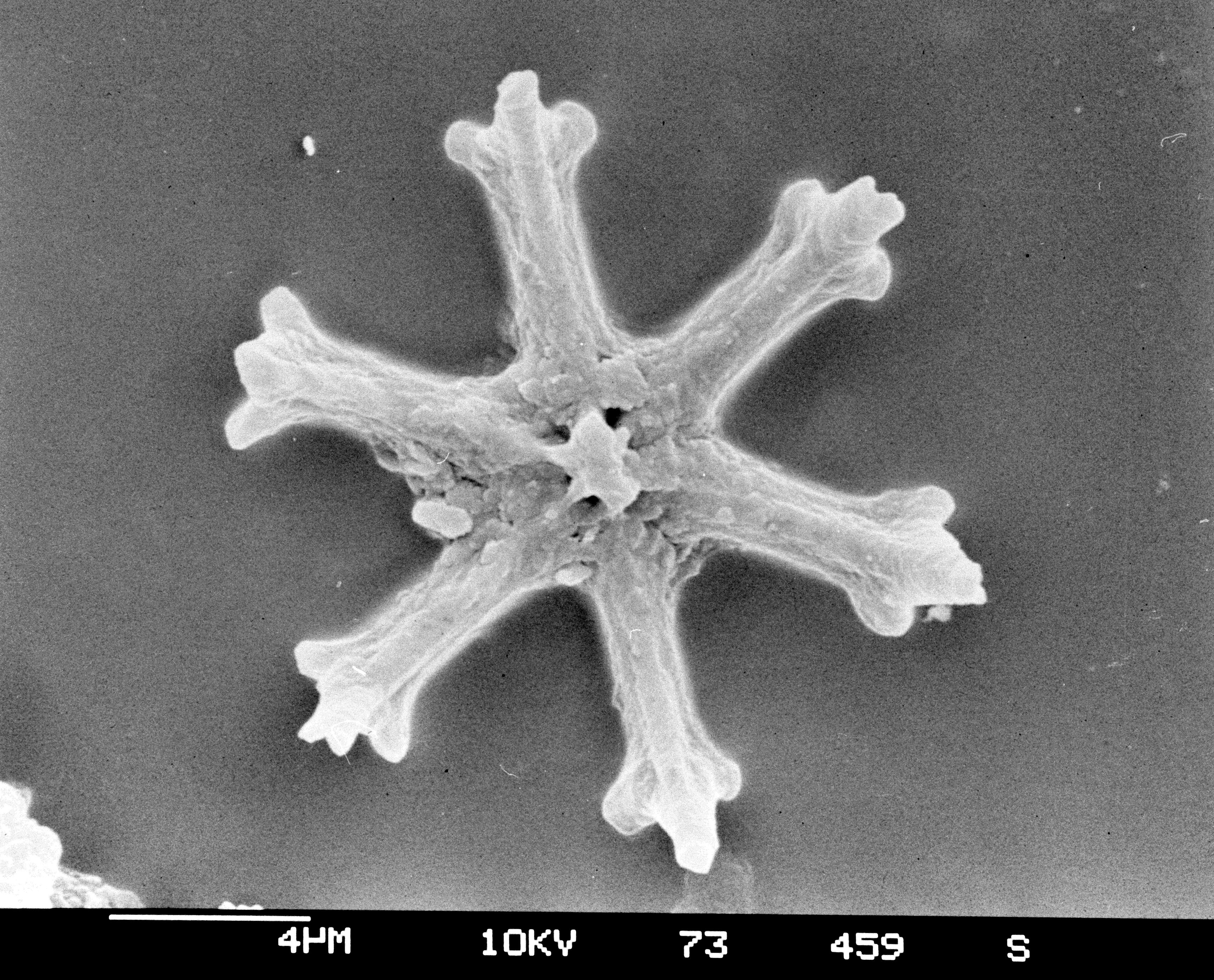
...extinct fossil

Coccolithophores build calcite skeletons important to the marine carbon cycle.

Coccolithophores are minute unicellular photosynthetic protists with two flagella for locomotion. Most of them are protected by calcium carbonate shells covered with ornate circular plates or scales called coccoliths. The term coccolithophore derives from the Greek for a seed carrying stone, referring to their small size and the coccolith stones they carry. Under the right conditions they bloom, like other phytoplankton, and can turn the ocean milky white.

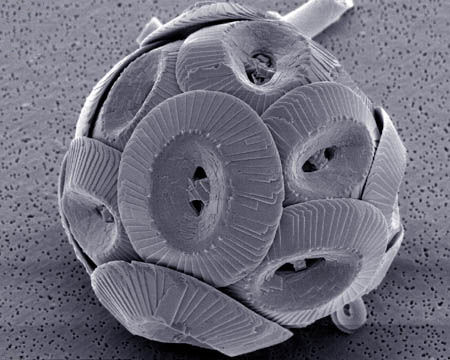
Fossil of Coccolithus pelagicus, about 10 μm across

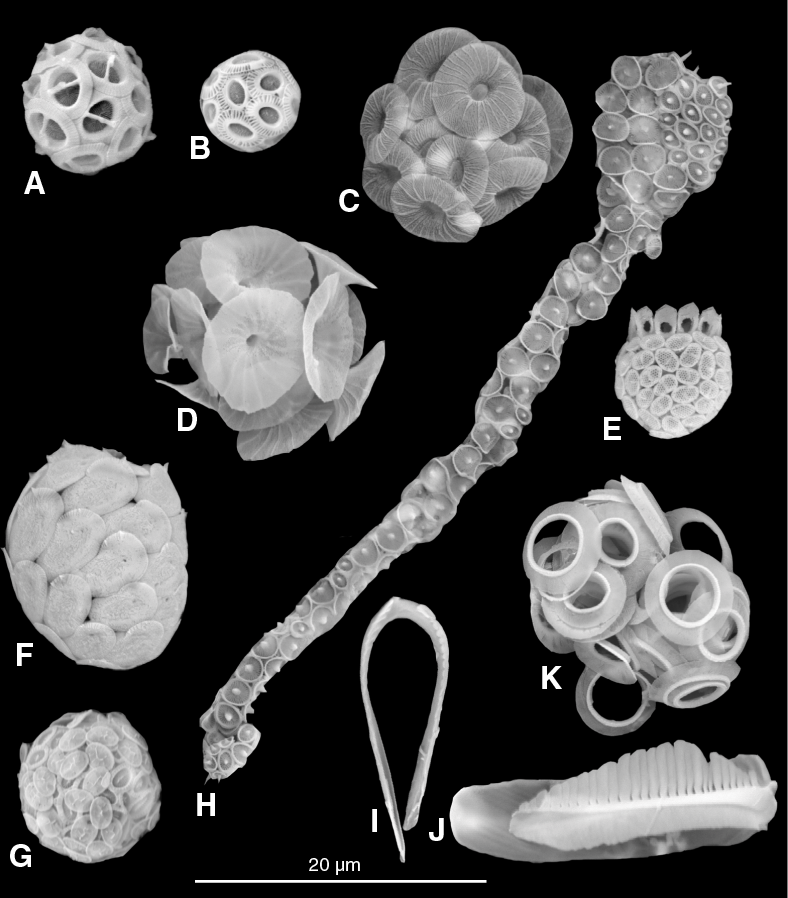
Diverse coccolithophores from the Maldives

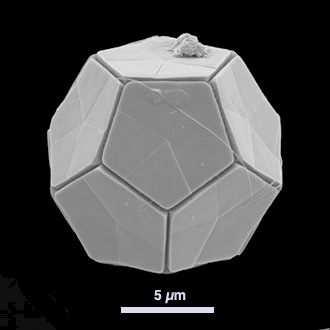
The fossil coccolithophore Braarudosphaera bigelowii has an unusual shell with a regular dodecahedral structure about 10 micrometers across.

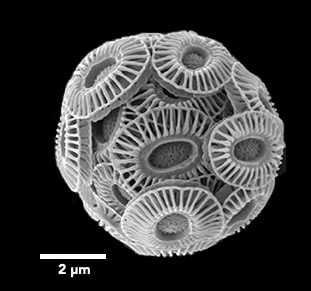
The coccolithophore Emiliania huxleyi

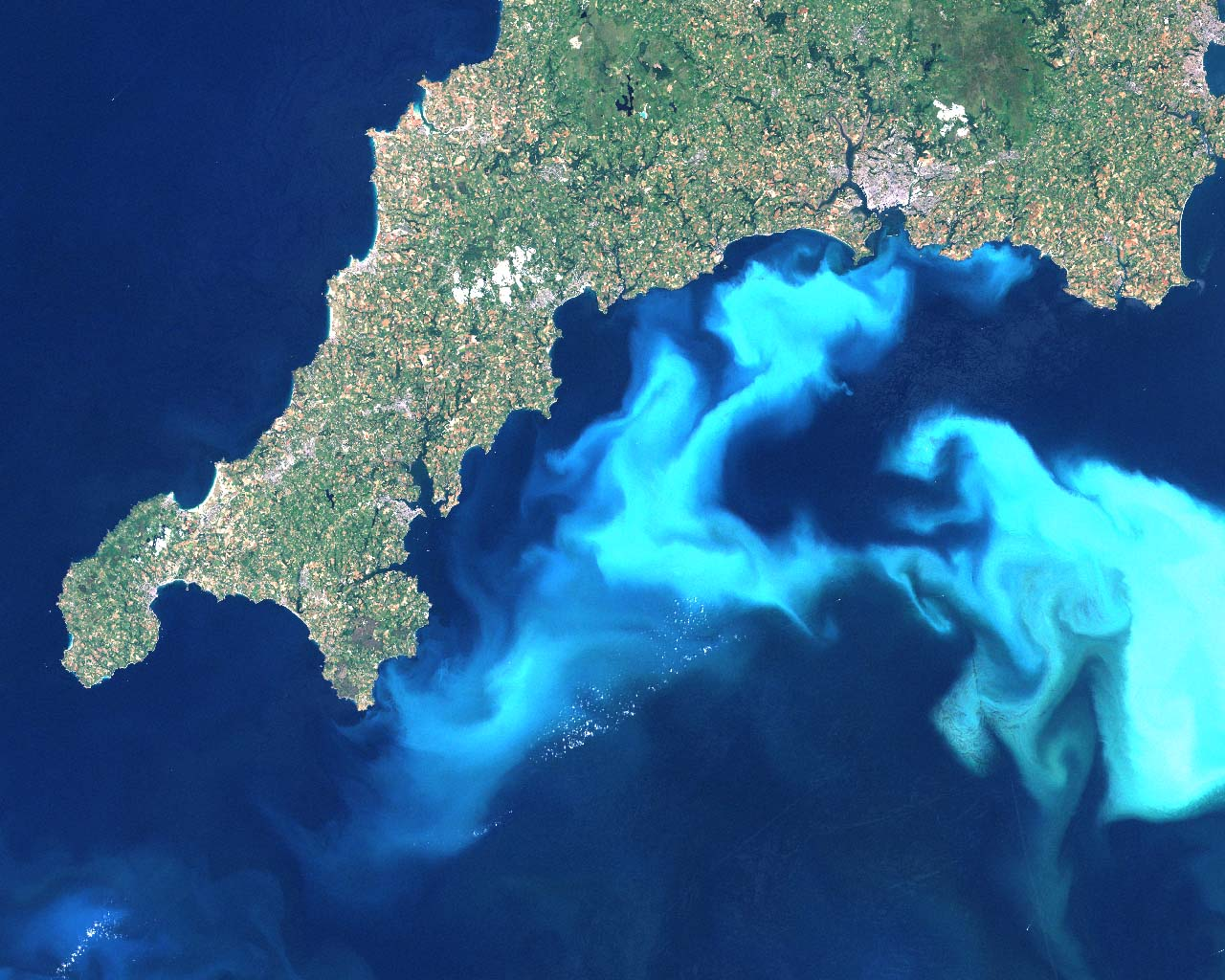
Algae bloom of Emiliania huxleyi off the southern coast of England

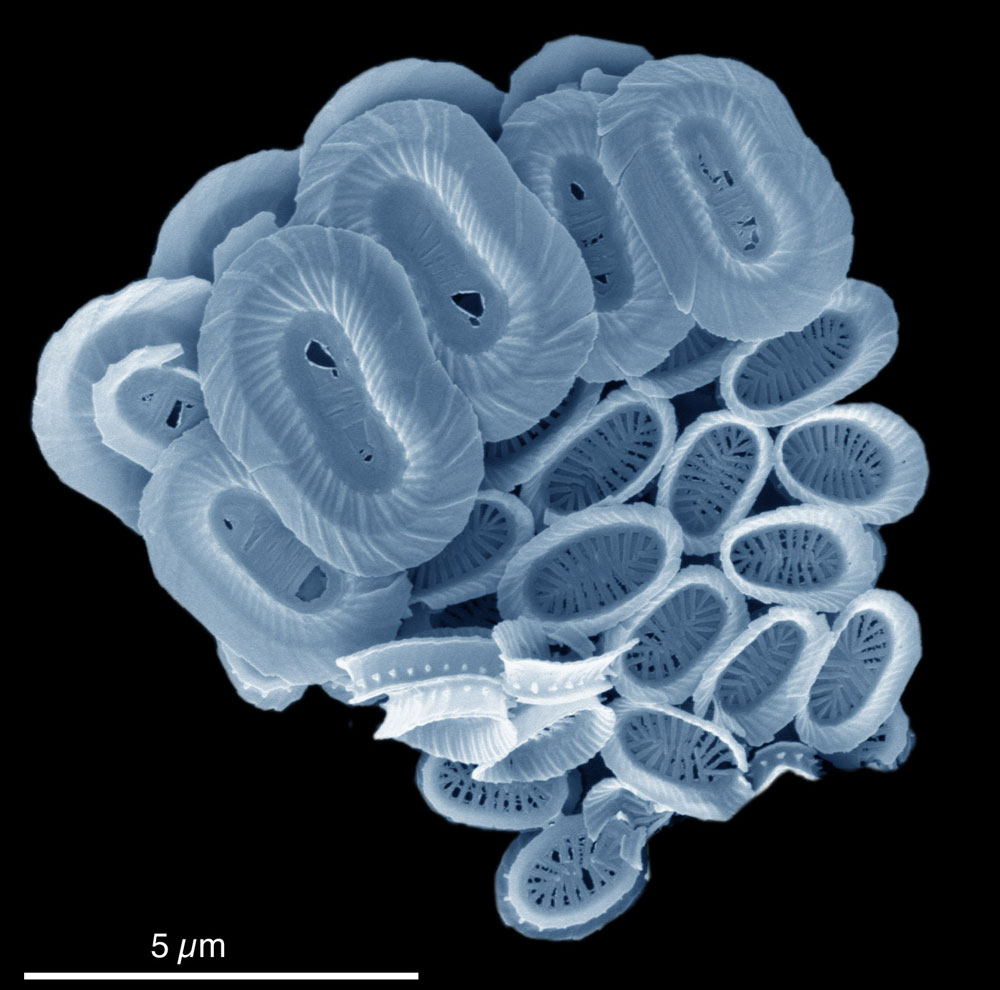
Coccolithophores named after the BBC documentary series
The Blue Planet

=== Dinoflagellates ===
Dinoflagellate shapes

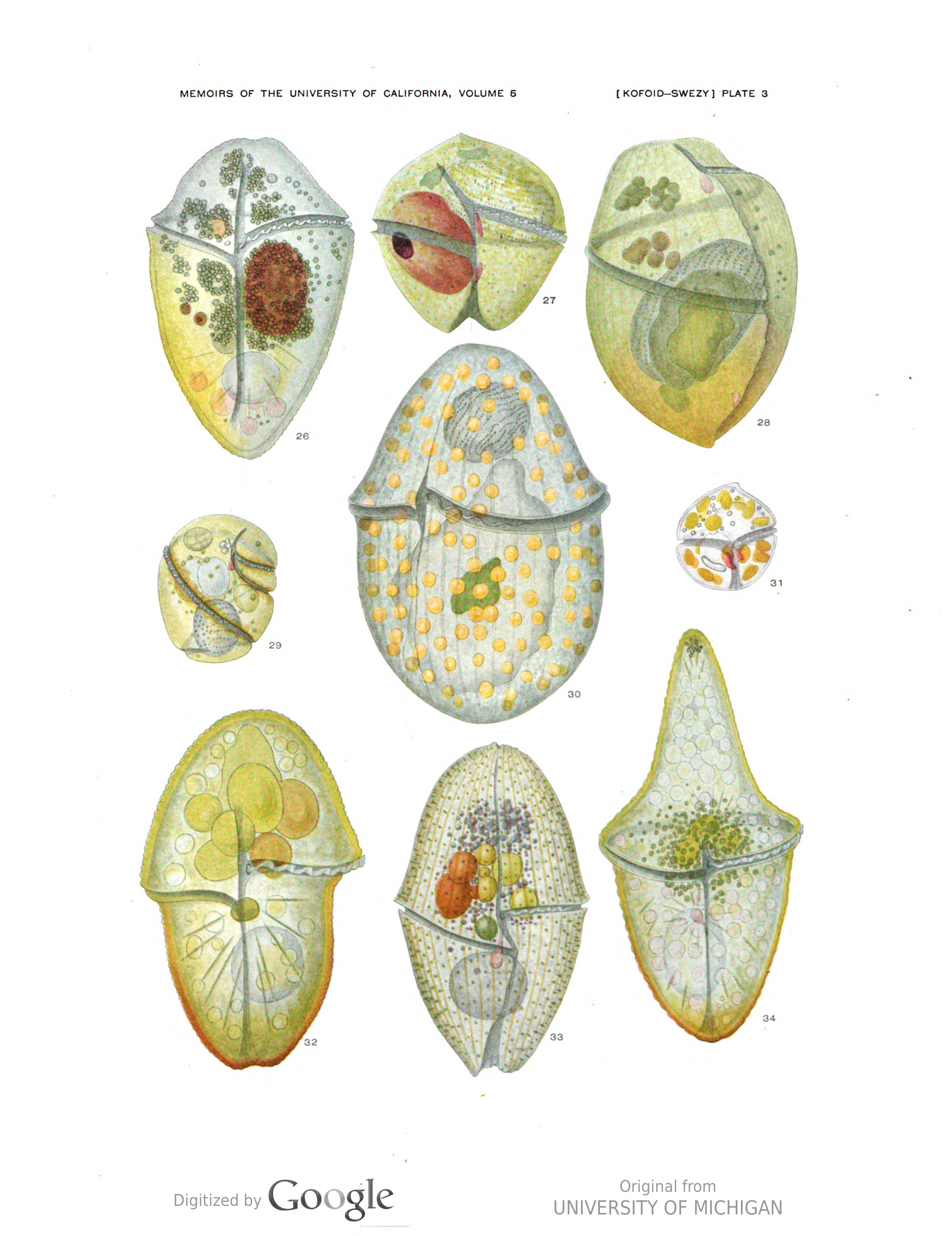
Unarmored dinoflagellates Kofoid (1921)

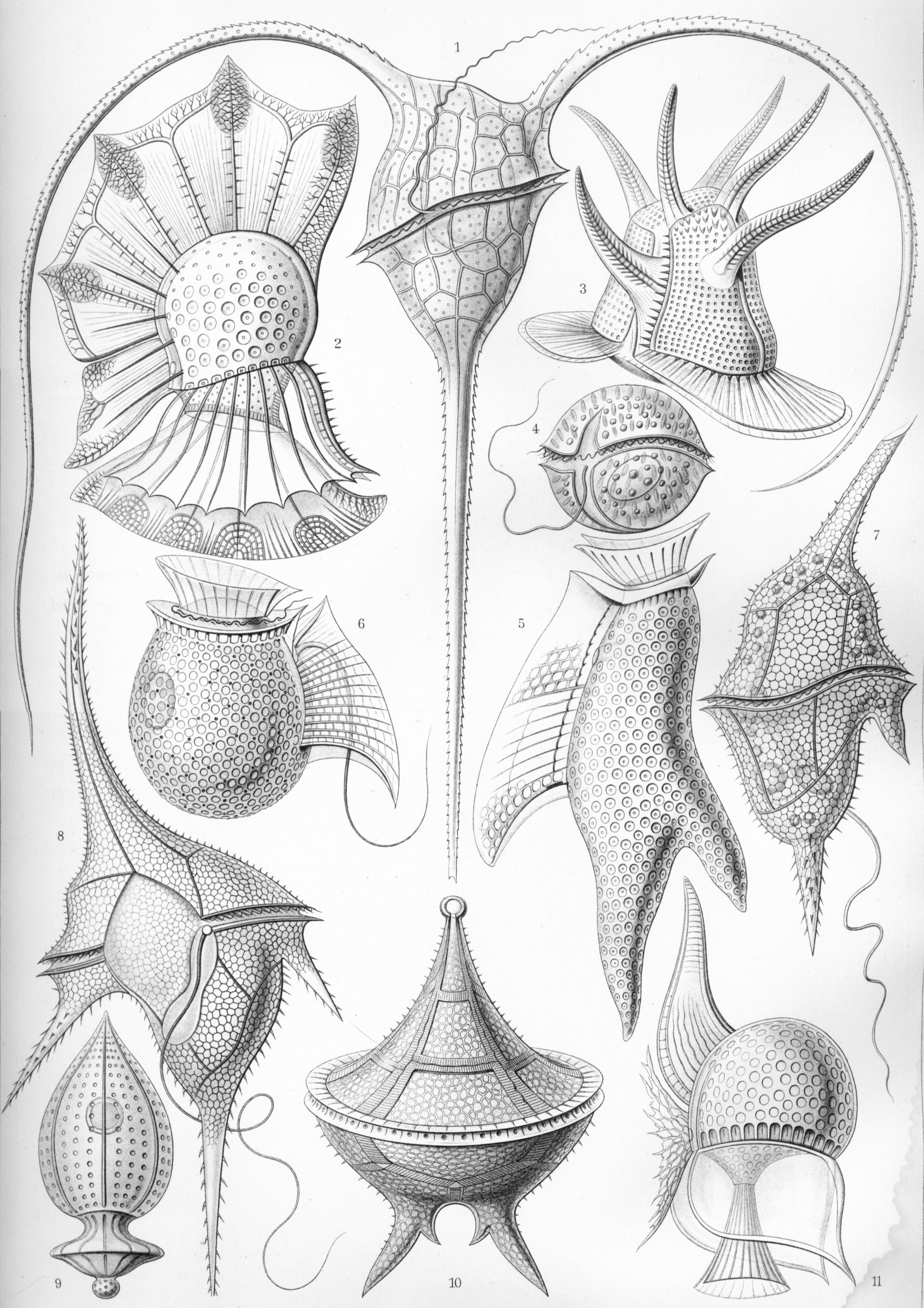
Haeckel Peridinea (1904)

Dinoflagellates are usually positioned as part of the algae group, and form a phylum of unicellular flagellates with about 2,000 marine species. The name comes from the Greek "dinos" meaning whirling and the Latin "flagellum" meaning a whip or lash. This refers to the two whip-like attachments (flagella) used for forward movement. Most dinoflagellates are protected with red-brown, cellulose armour. Like other phytoplankton, dinoflagellates are r-strategists which under right conditions can bloom and create red tides. Excavates may be the most basal flagellate lineage.

By trophic orientation dinoflagellates are all over the place. Some dinoflagellates are known to be photosynthetic, but a large fraction of these are in fact mixotrophic, combining photosynthesis with ingestion of prey (phagotrophy). Some species are endosymbionts of marine animals and other protists, and play an important part in the biology of coral reefs. Others predate other protozoa, and a few forms are parasitic. Many dinoflagellates are mixotrophic and could also be classified as phytoplankton.

The toxic dinoflagellate Dinophysis acuta acquire chloroplasts from its prey. "It cannot catch the cryptophytes by itself, and instead relies on ingesting ciliates such as the red Mesodinium rubrum, which sequester their chloroplasts from a specific cryptophyte clade (Geminigera/Plagioselmis/Teleaulax)".

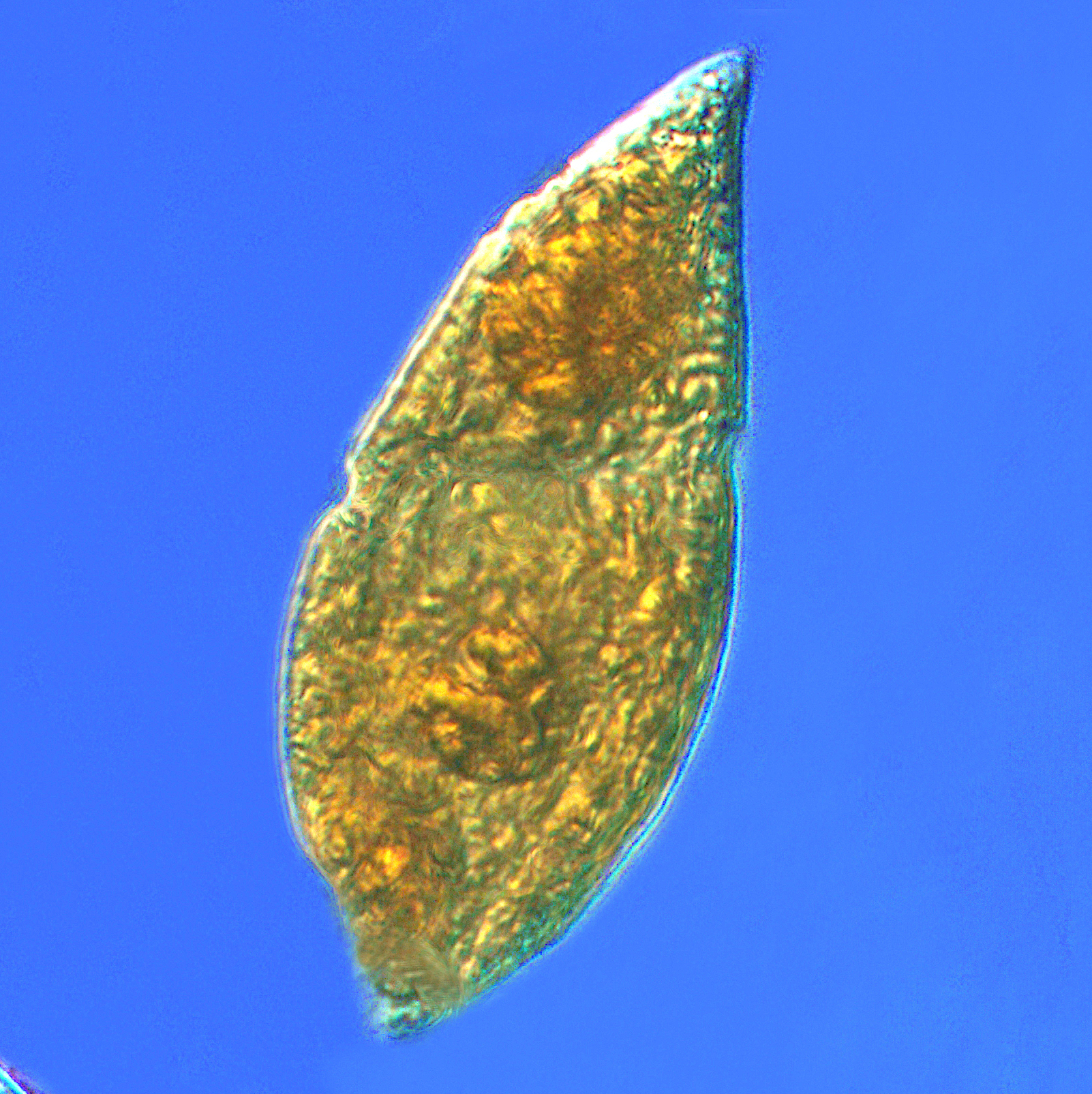
Gyrodinium, one of the few naked dinoflagellates which lack armour

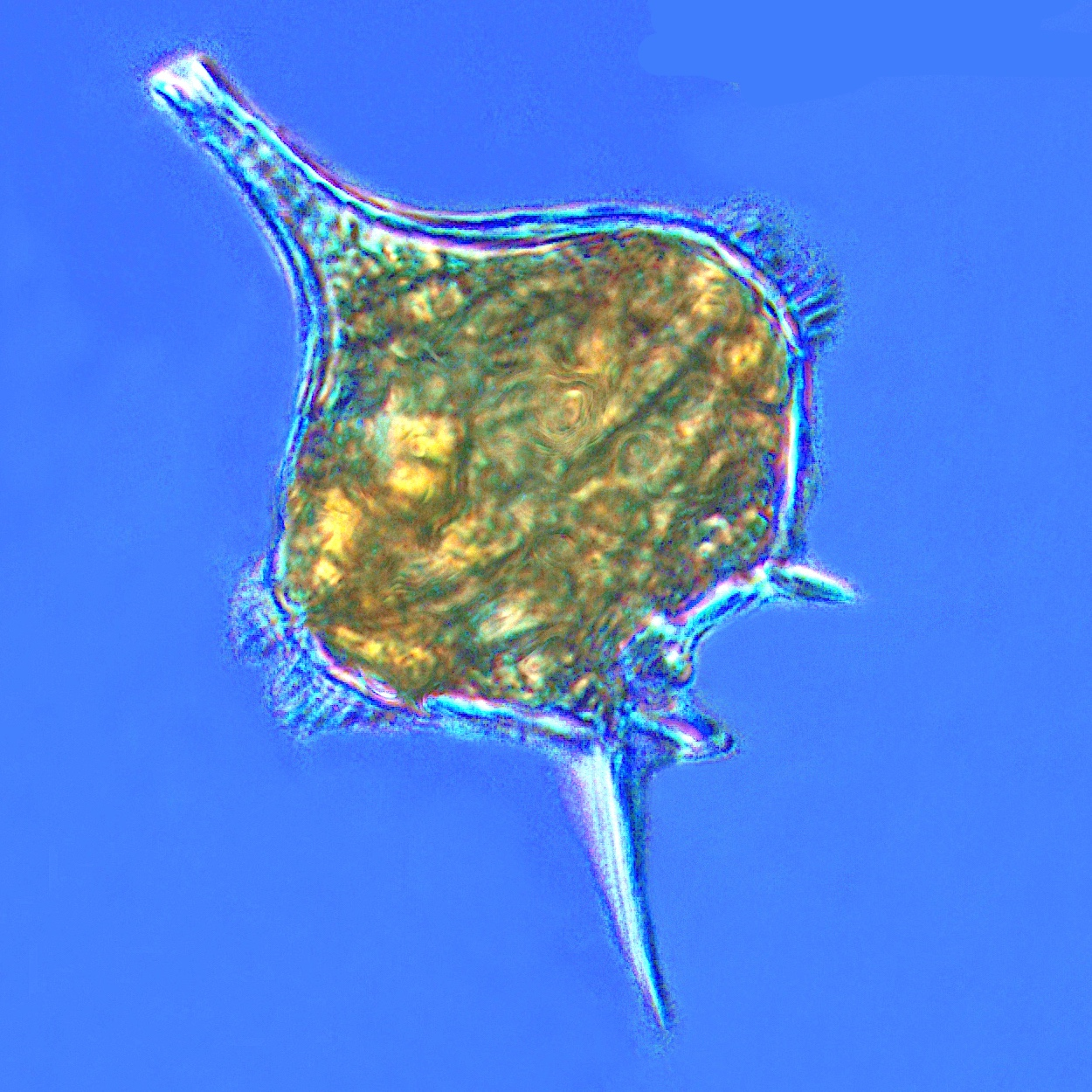
The dinoflagellate Protoperidinium extrudes a large feeding veil to capture prey.

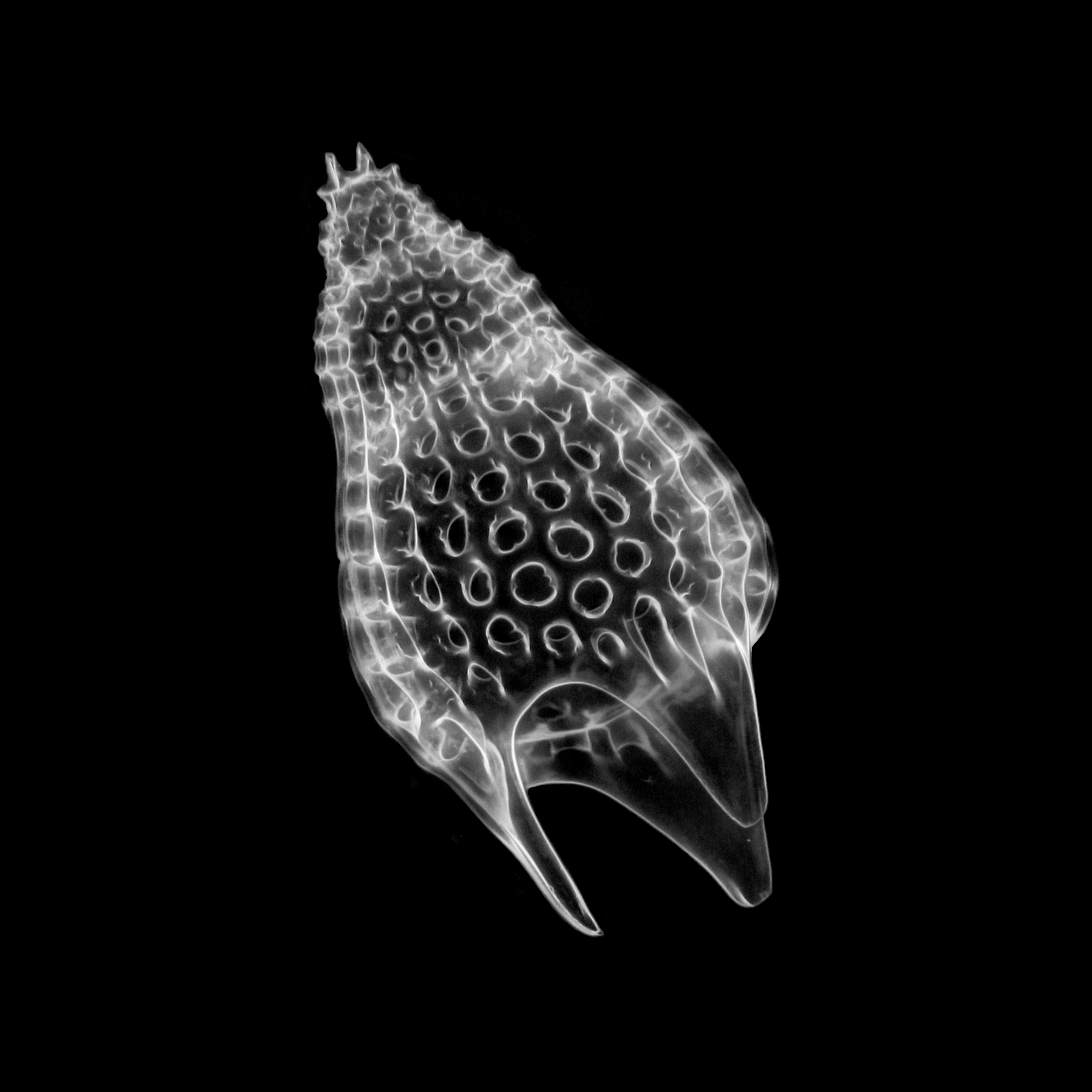
Nassellarian radiolarians can be in symbiosis with dinoflagellates.

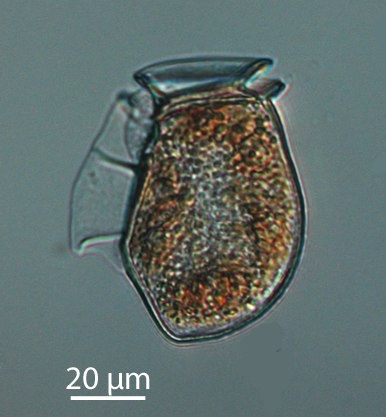
The dinoflagellate Dinophysis acuta

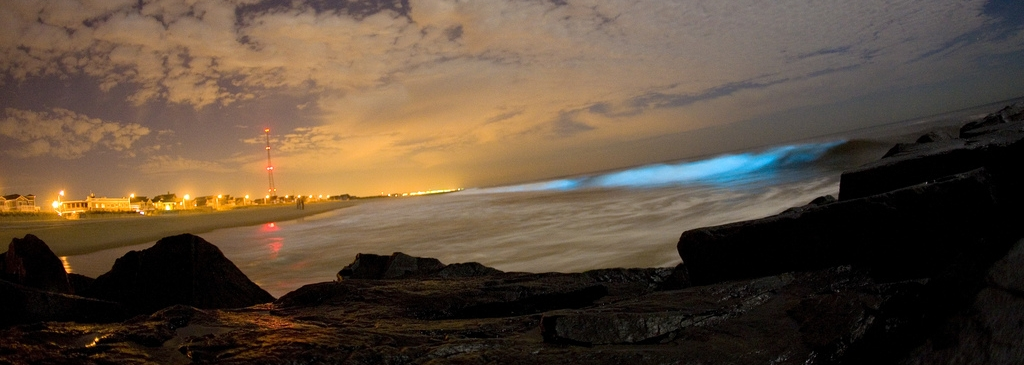
A surf wave at night sparkles with blue light due to the presence of a bioluminescent dinoflagellate, such as Lingulodinium polyedrum.

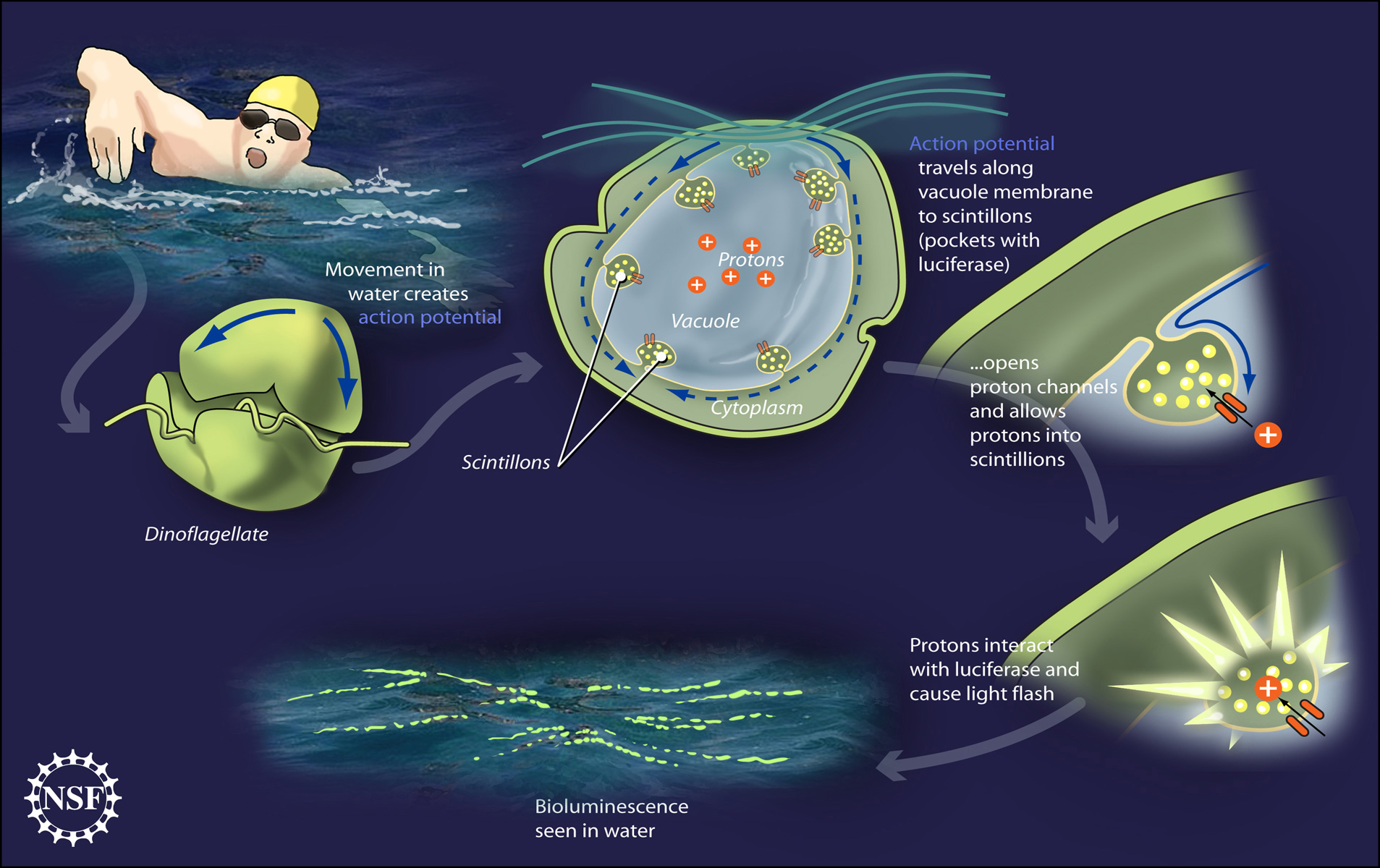
Suggested explanation for glowing seas

Dinoflagellates

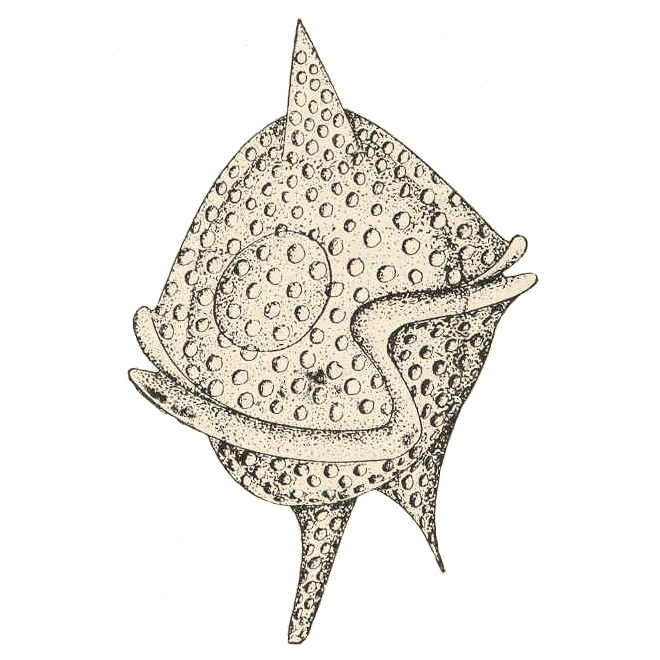
Armoured

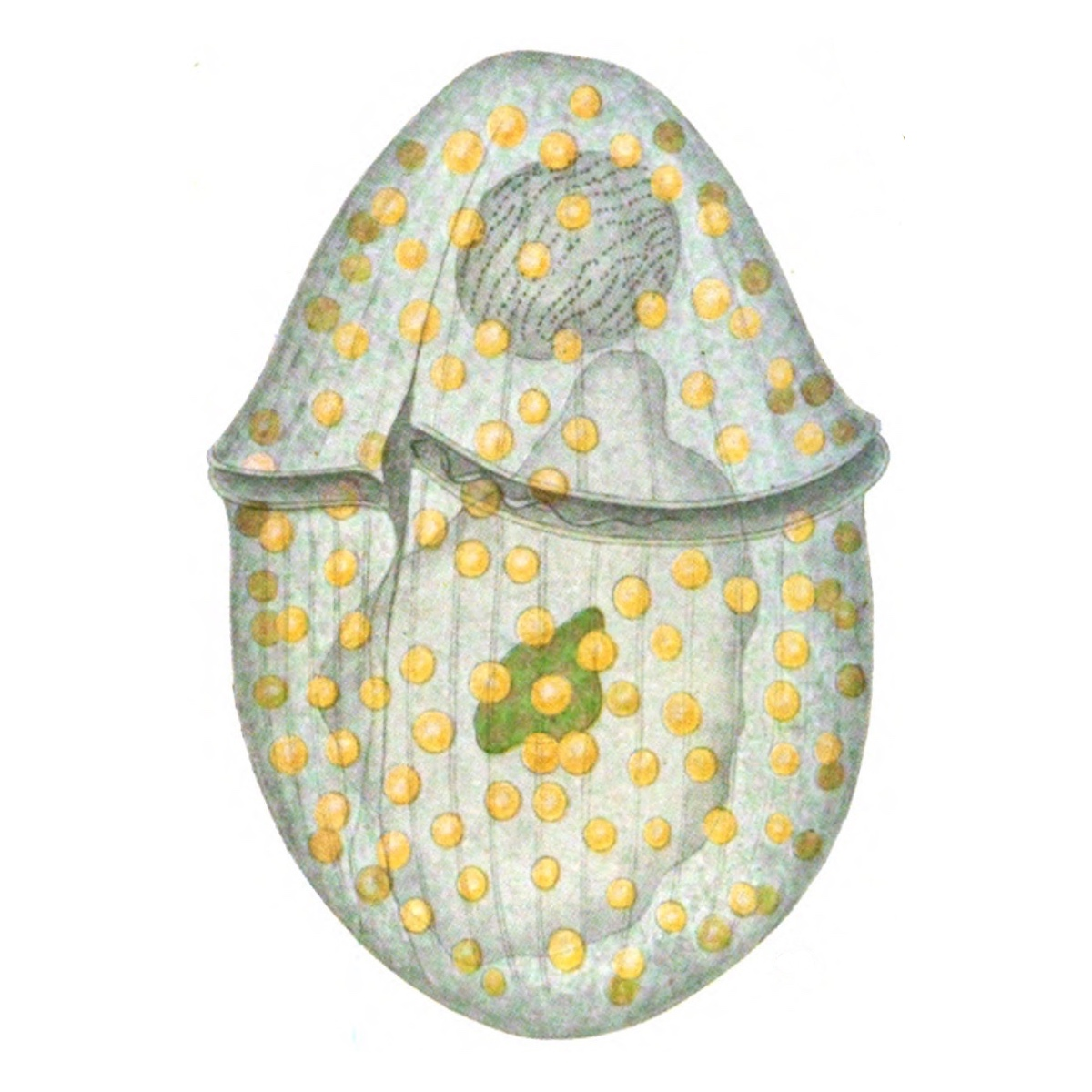
Unarmoured

Traditionally dinoflagellates have been presented as armoured or unarmoured.

Dinoflagellates often live in symbiosis with other organisms. Many nassellarian radiolarians house dinoflagellate symbionts within their tests. The nassellarian provides ammonium and carbon dioxide for the dinoflagellate, while the dinoflagellate provides the nassellarian with a mucous membrane useful for hunting and protection against harmful invaders. There is evidence from DNA analysis that dinoflagellate symbiosis with radiolarians evolved independently from other dinoflagellate symbioses, such as with foraminifera.

Some dinoflagellates are bioluminescent. At night, ocean water can light up internally and sparkle with blue light because of these dinoflagellates. Bioluminescent dinoflagellates possess scintillons, individual cytoplasmic bodies which contain dinoflagellate luciferase, the main enzyme involved in the luminescence. The luminescence, sometimes called the phosphorescence of the sea, occurs as brief (0.1 sec) blue flashes or sparks when individual scintillons are stimulated, usually by mechanical disturbances from, for example, a boat or a swimmer or surf.

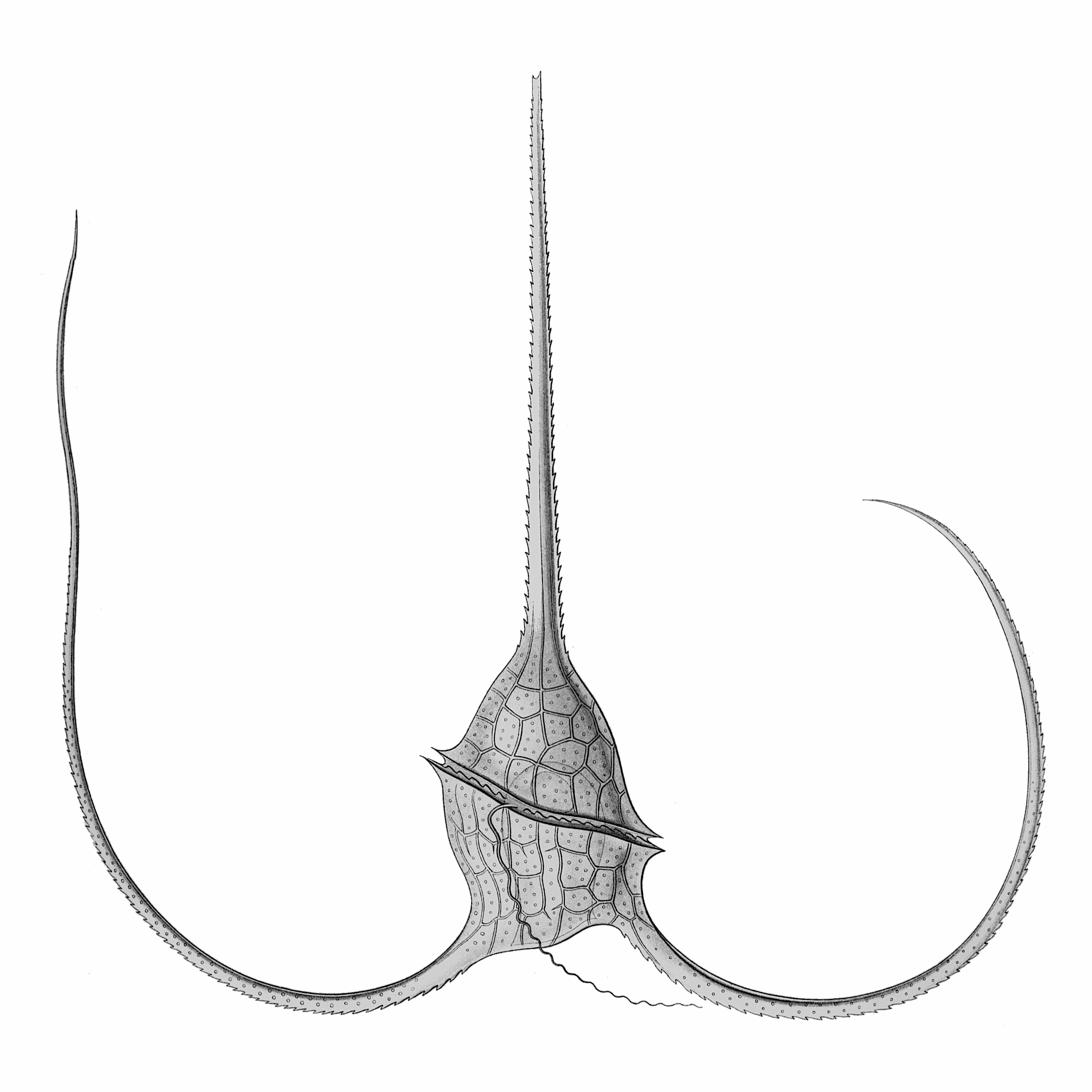
Tripos muelleri is recognisable by its U-shaped horns.

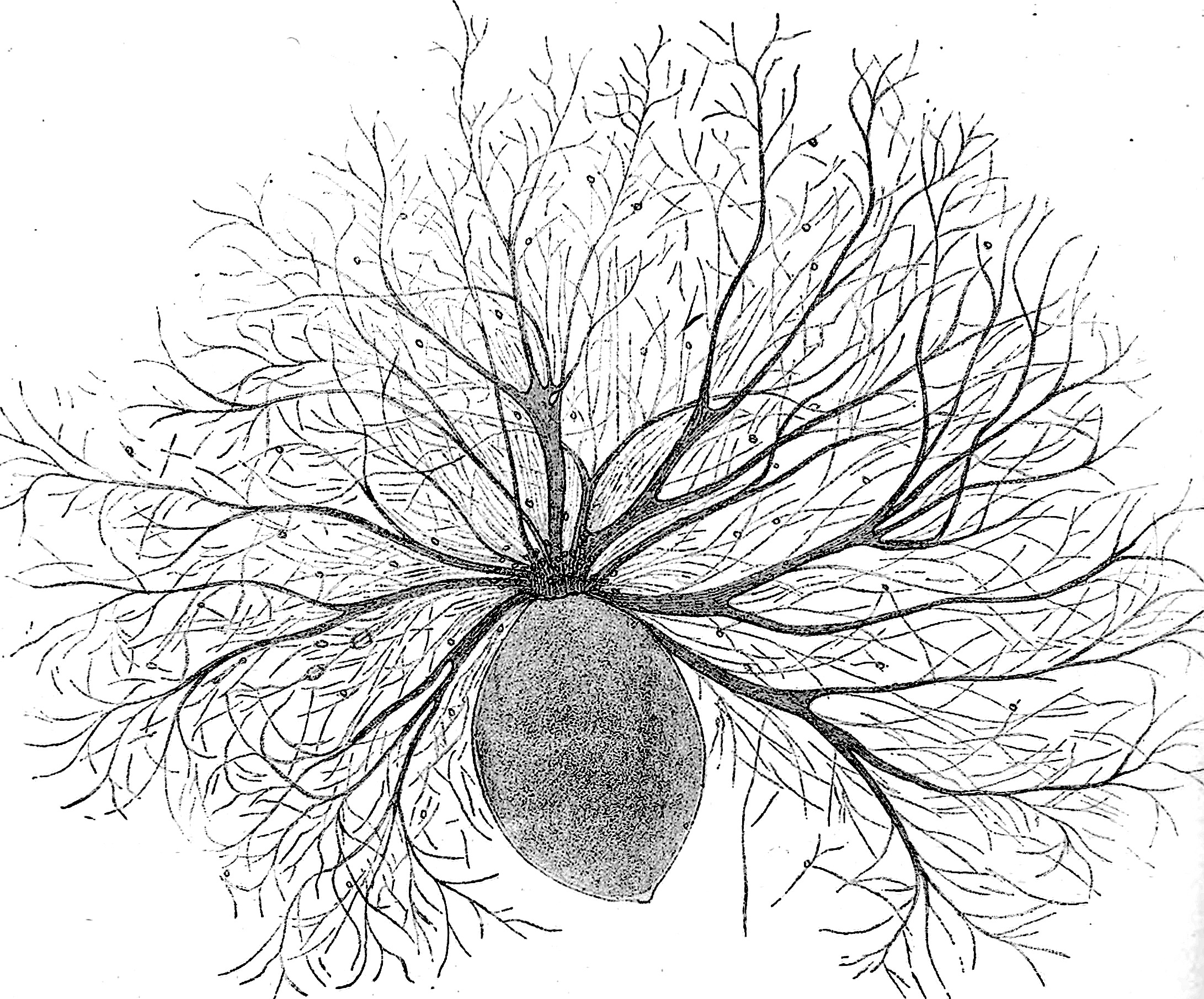
Oodinium, a genus of parasitic dinoflagellates, causes velvet disease in fish.

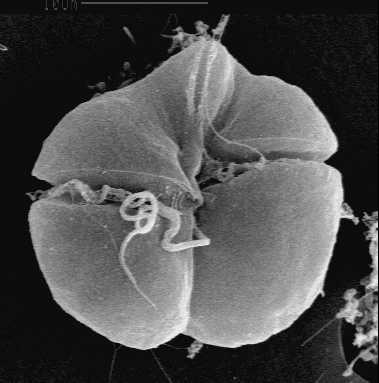
Karenia brevis produces red tides highly toxic to humans.
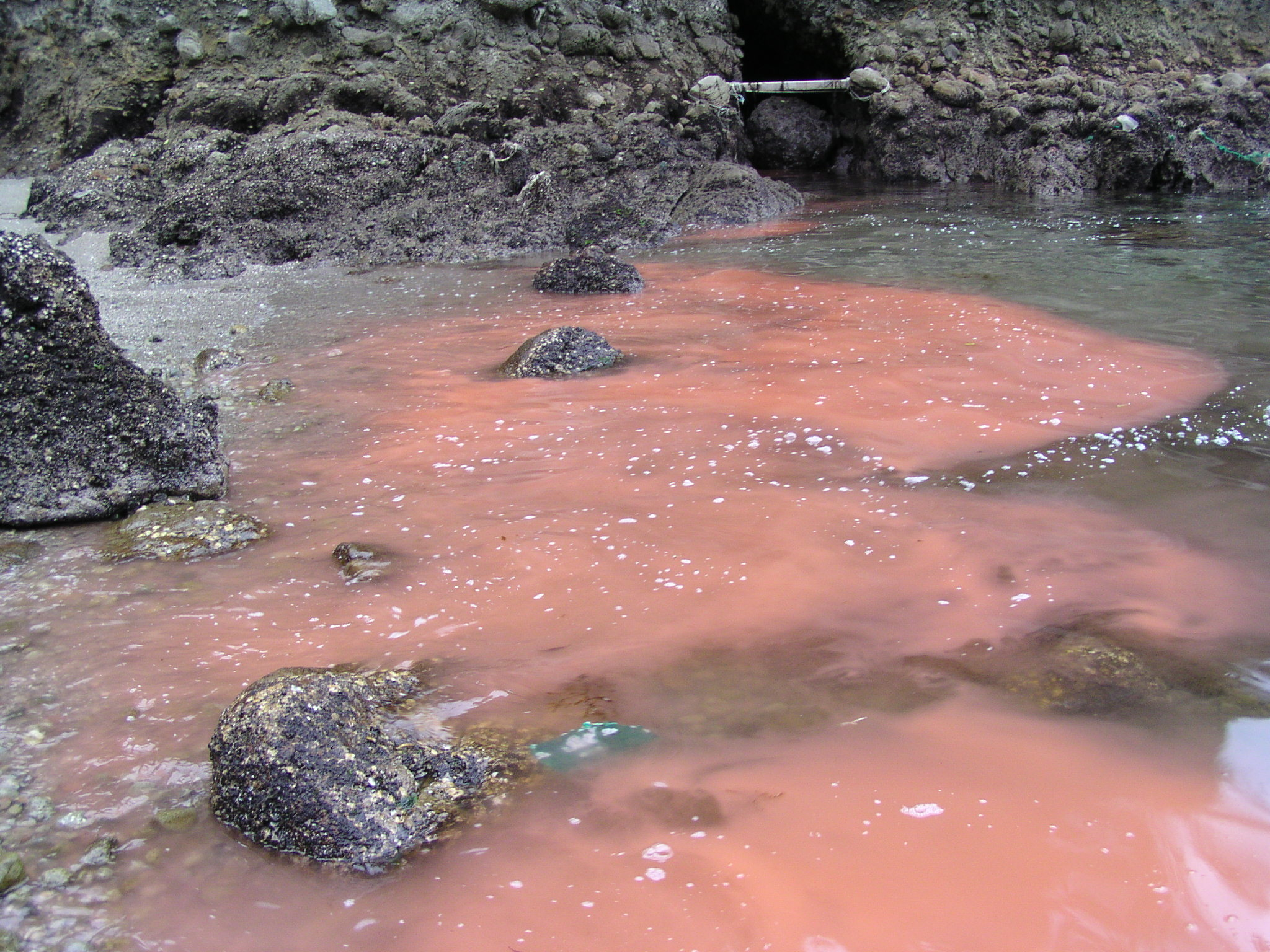
Red tide

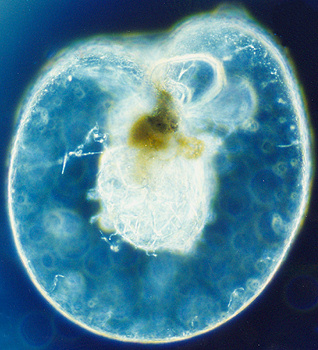
Noctiluca scintillans, a bioluminescent dinoflagellate

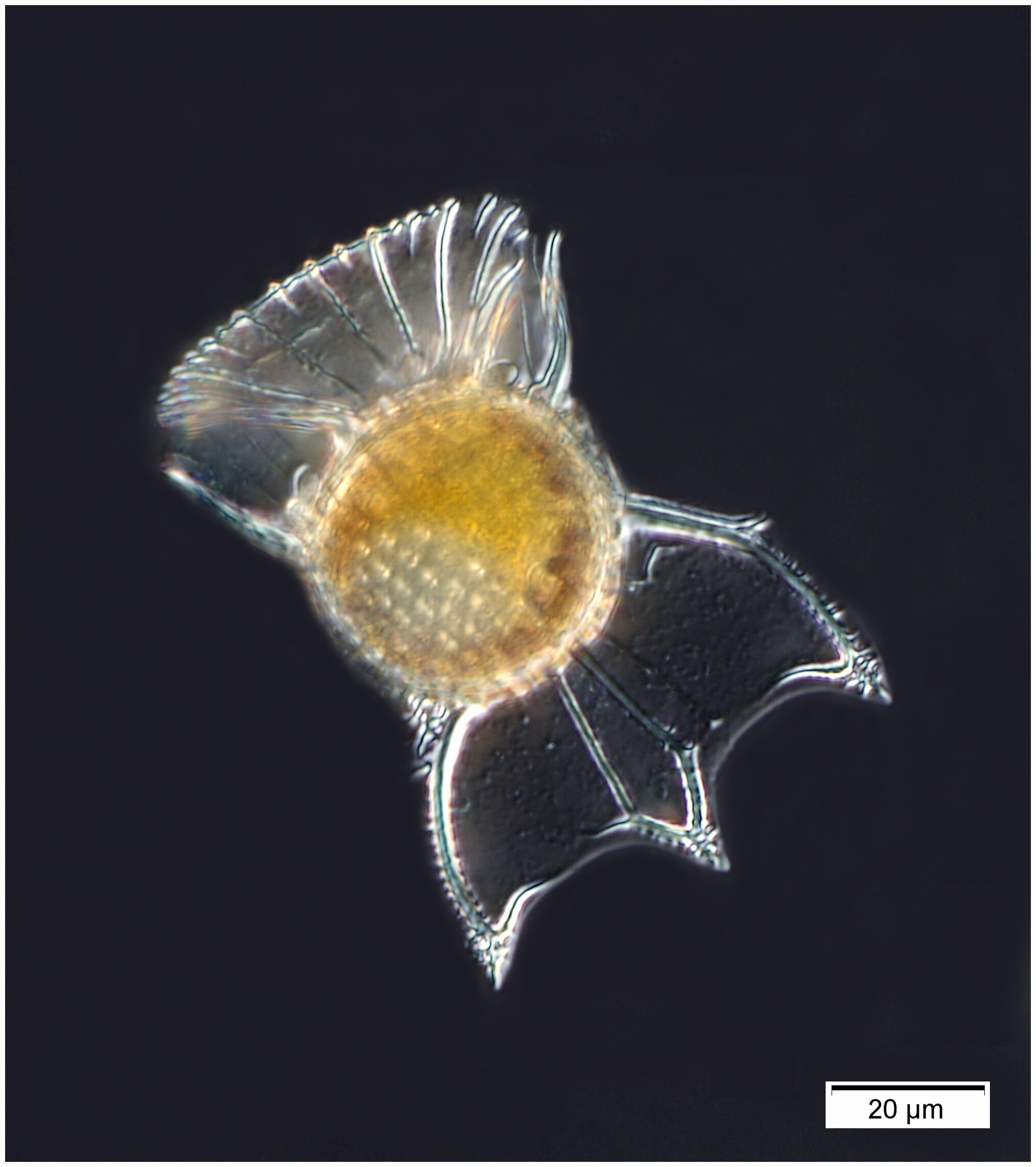
Ornithocercus heteroporus - prominent lists on display

== Marine protozoans ==
Protozoans are protists which feed on organic matter such as other microorganisms or organic tissues and debris. Historically, the protozoa were regarded as "one-celled animals", because they often possess animal-like behaviours, such as motility and predation, and lack a cell wall, as found in plants and many algae. Although the traditional practice of grouping protozoa with animals is no longer considered valid, the term continues to be used in a loose way to identify single-celled organisms that can move independently and feed by heterotrophy.

Marine protozoans include zooflagellates, foraminiferans, radiolarians and some dinoflagellates.

=== Radiolarians ===
Radiolarian shapes
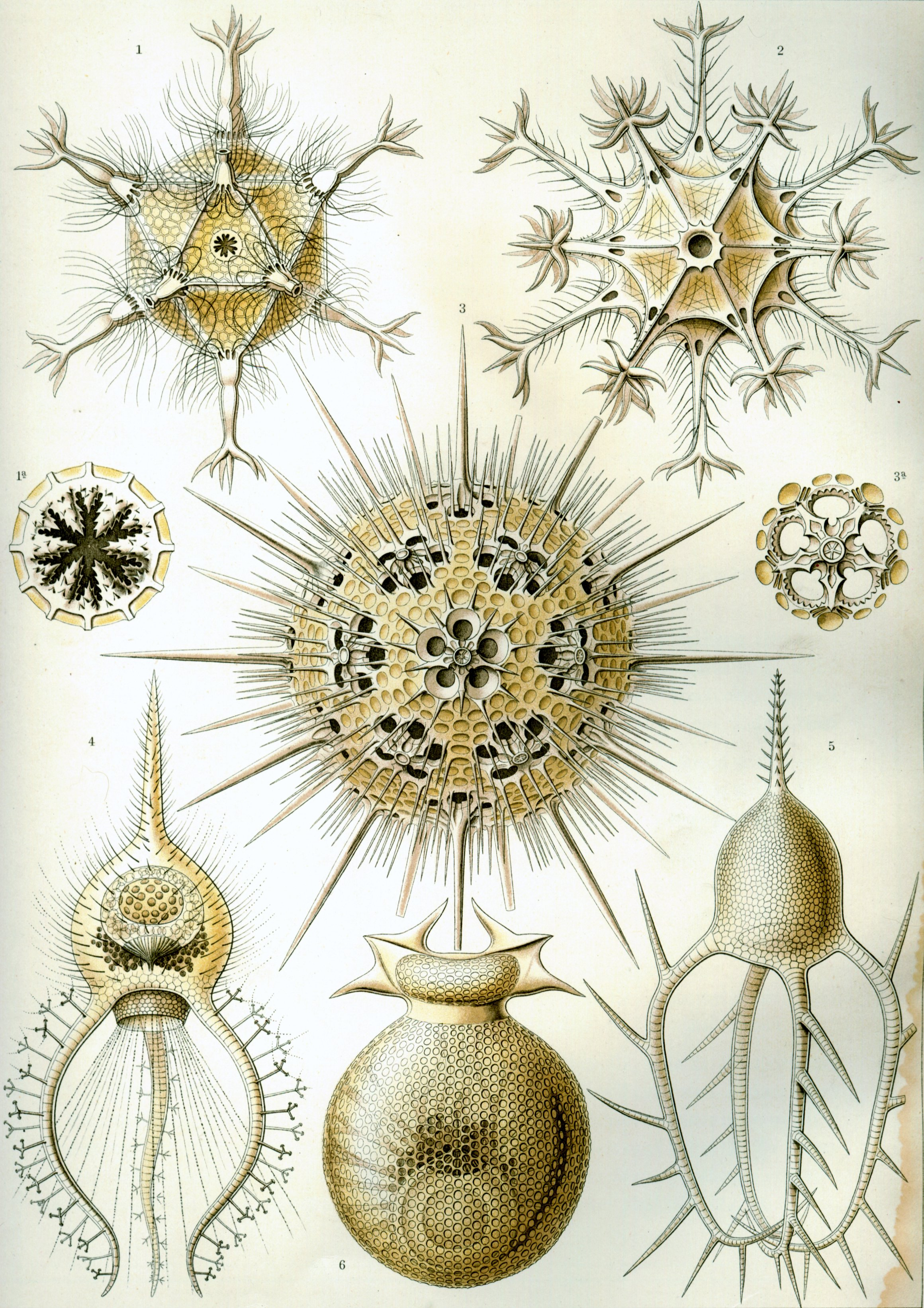
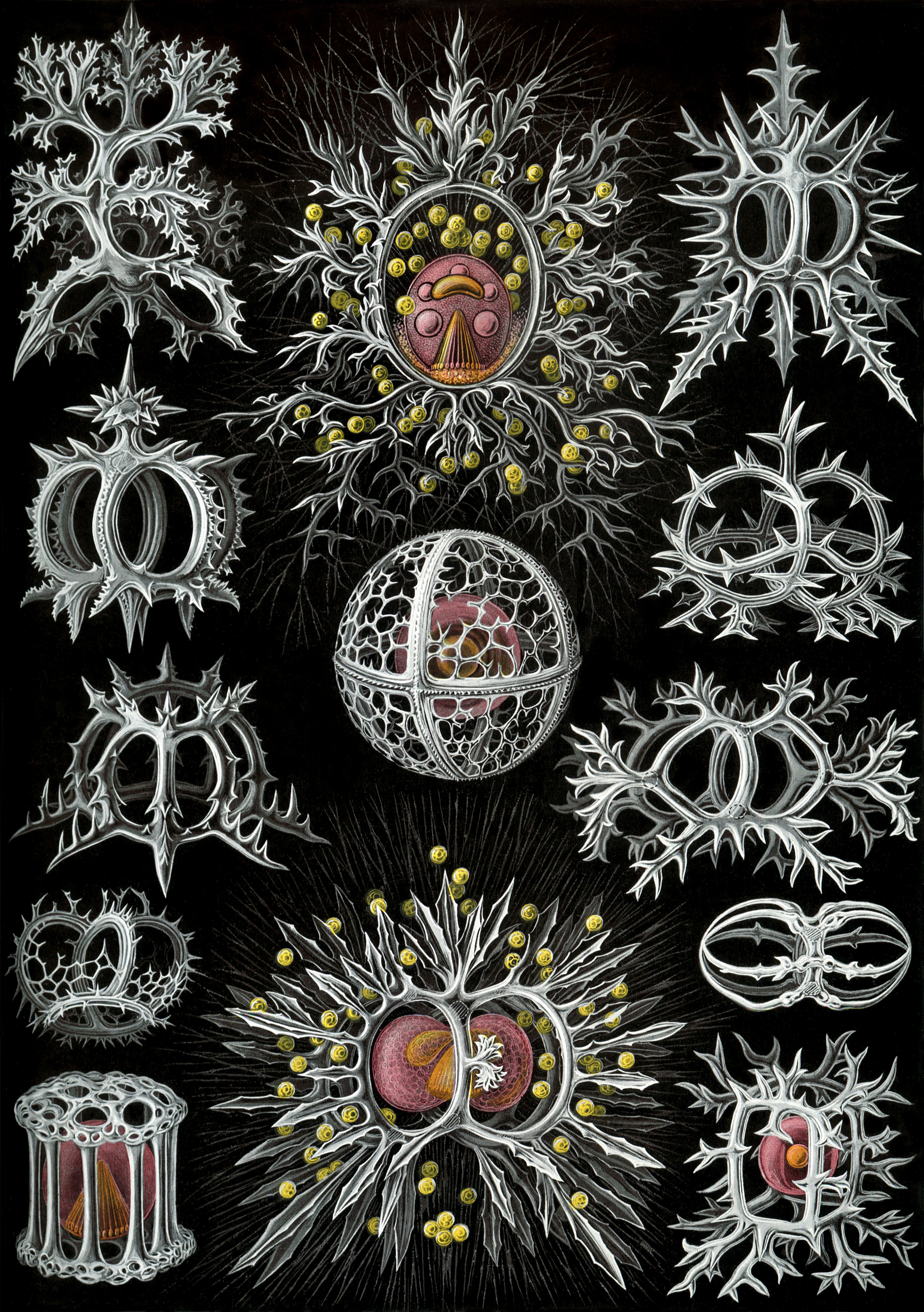
Drawings by Haeckel 1904 (click for details)

Radiolarians are unicellular predatory protists encased in elaborate globular shells, typically between 0.1 and 0.2 millimetres in size, usually made of silica and pierced with holes. Their name comes from the Latin for "radius". They catch prey by extending parts of their body through the holes. As with the silica frustules of diatoms, radiolarian shells can sink to the ocean floor when radiolarians die and become preserved as part of the ocean sediment. These remains, as microfossils, provide valuable information about past oceanic conditions.

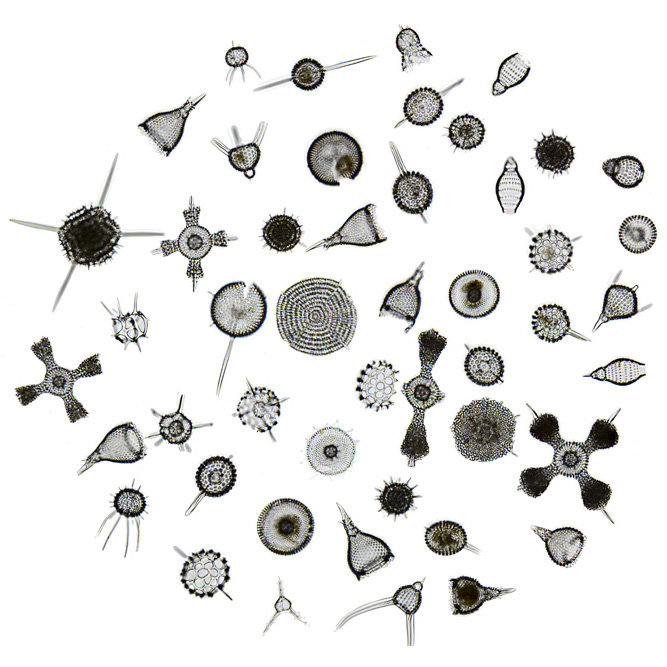
Like diatoms, radiolarians come in many shapes.

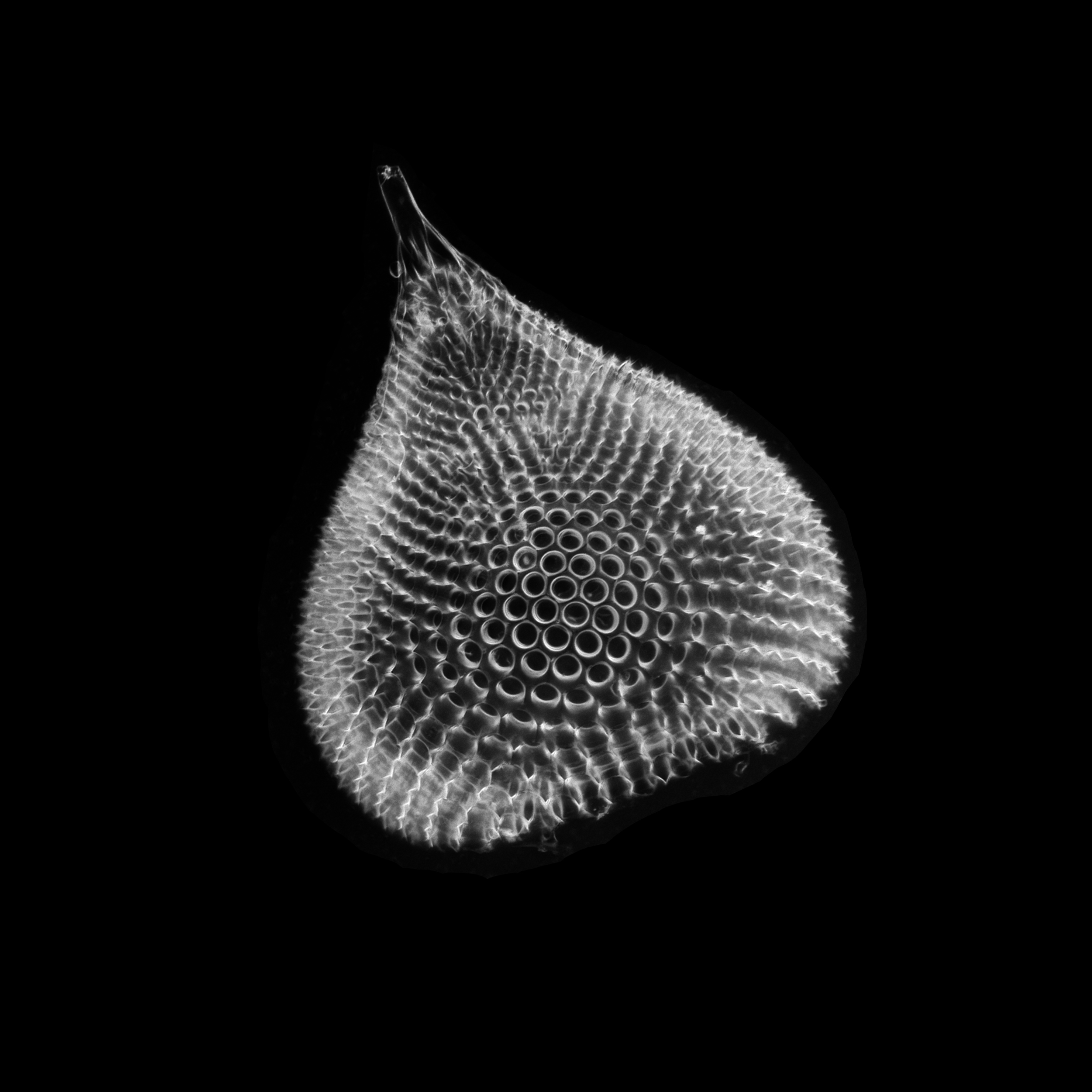
Also like diatoms, radiolarian shells are usually made of silicate.

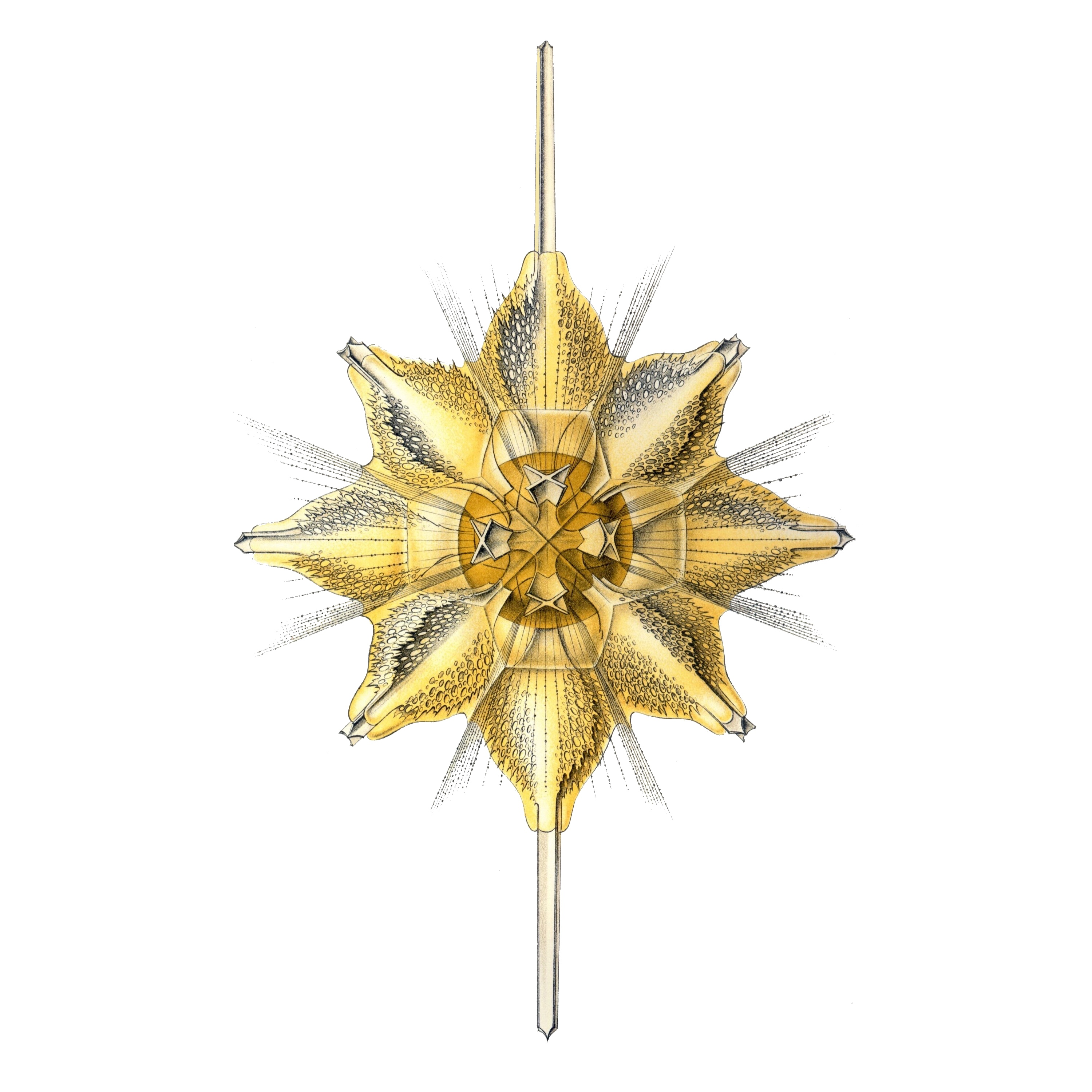
However acantharian radiolarians have shells made from strontium sulfate crystals.

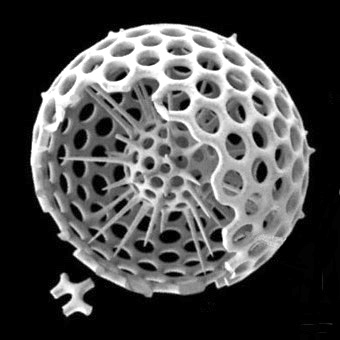
Cutaway schematic diagram of a spherical radiolarian shell
Turing and radiolarian morphology

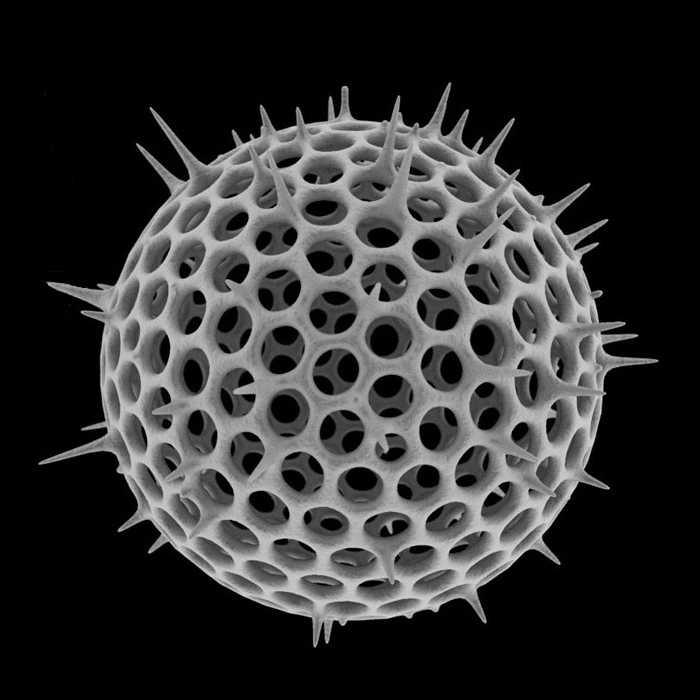
Shell of a spherical radiolarian

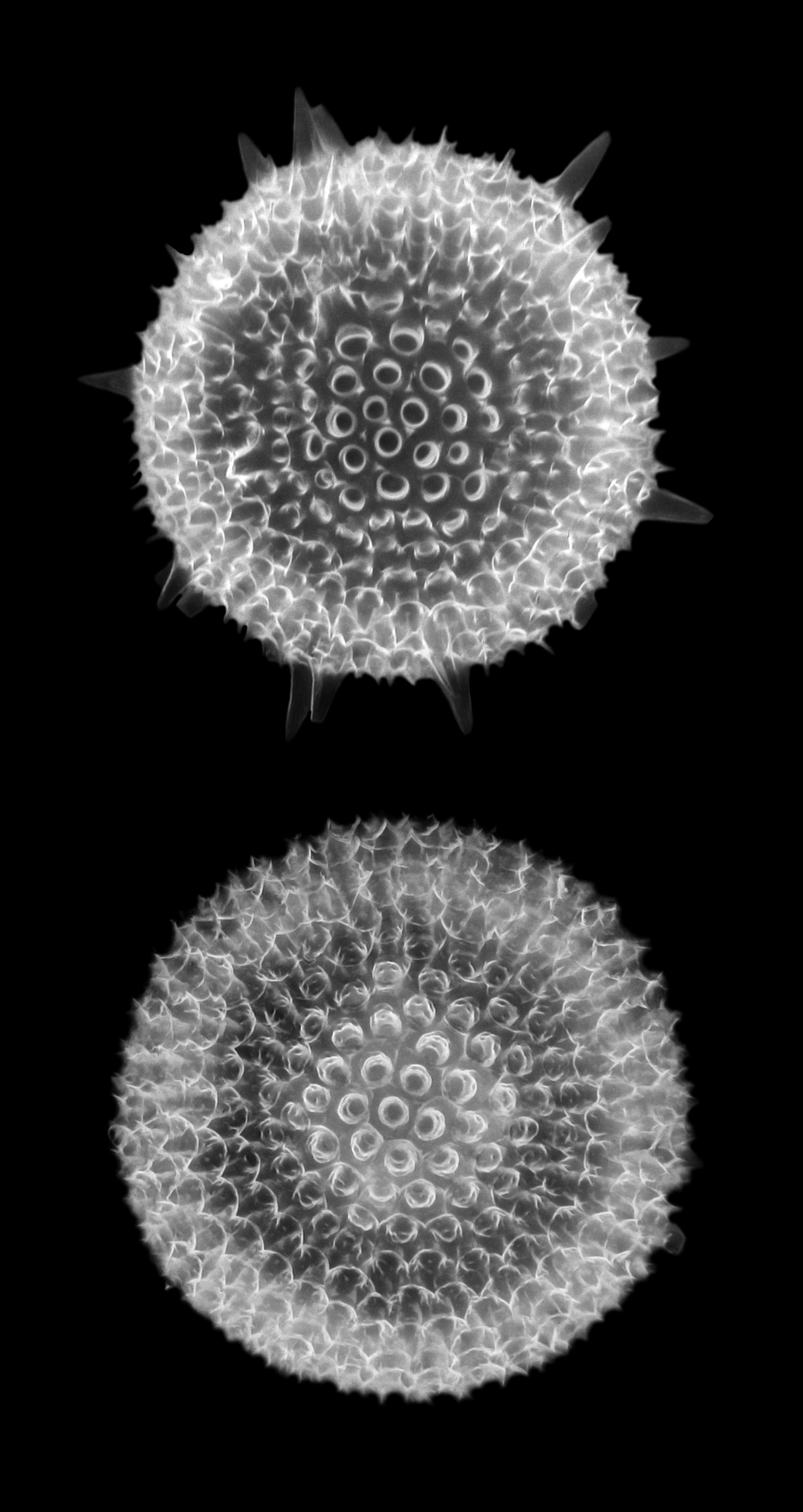
Shell micrographs

Computer simulations of Turing patterns on a sphere
closely replicate some radiolarian shell patterns.

External videos
- Radiolarian geometry
- Ernst Haeckel's radiolarian engravings

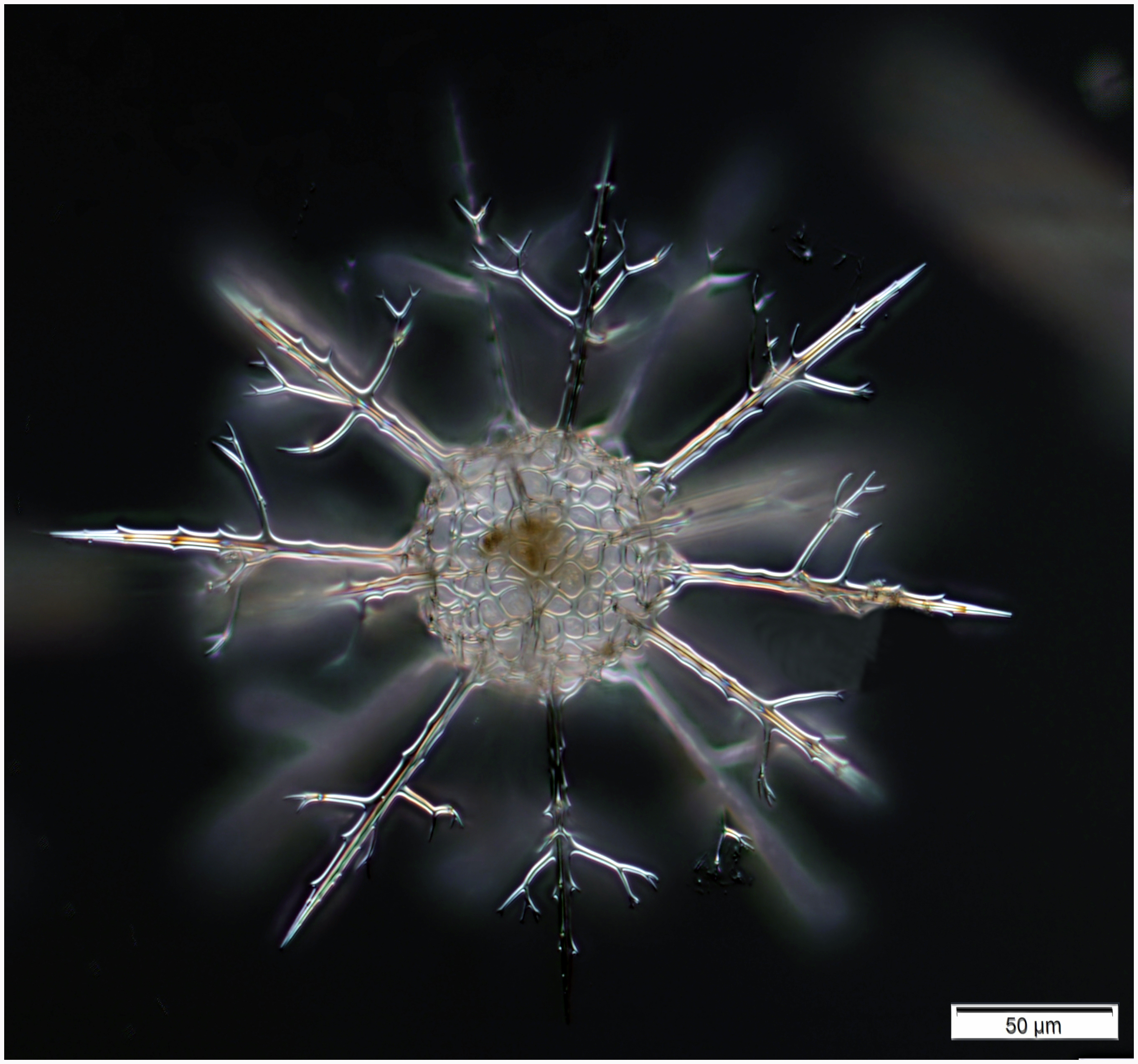
Cladococcus abietinus

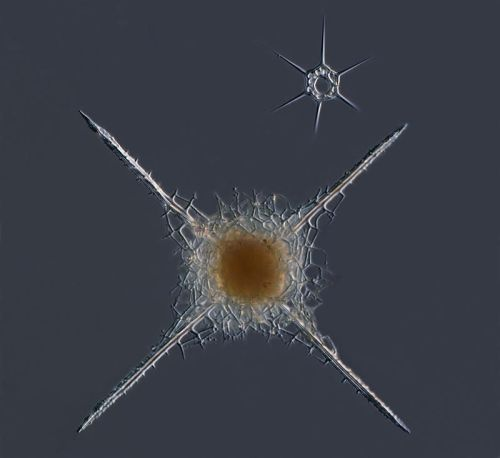
Cleveiplegma boreale

=== Foraminiferans ===
Foraminiferan shapes
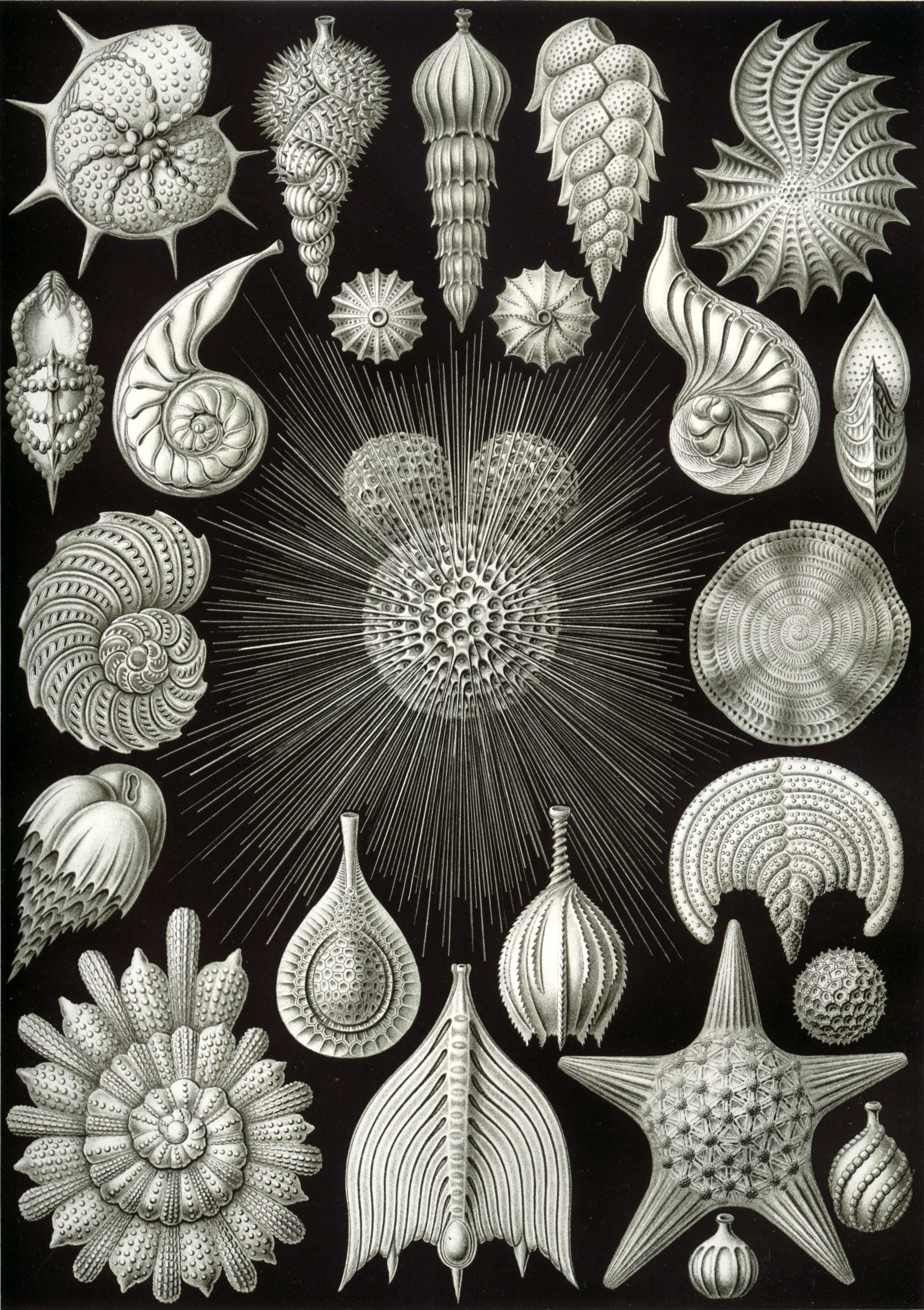
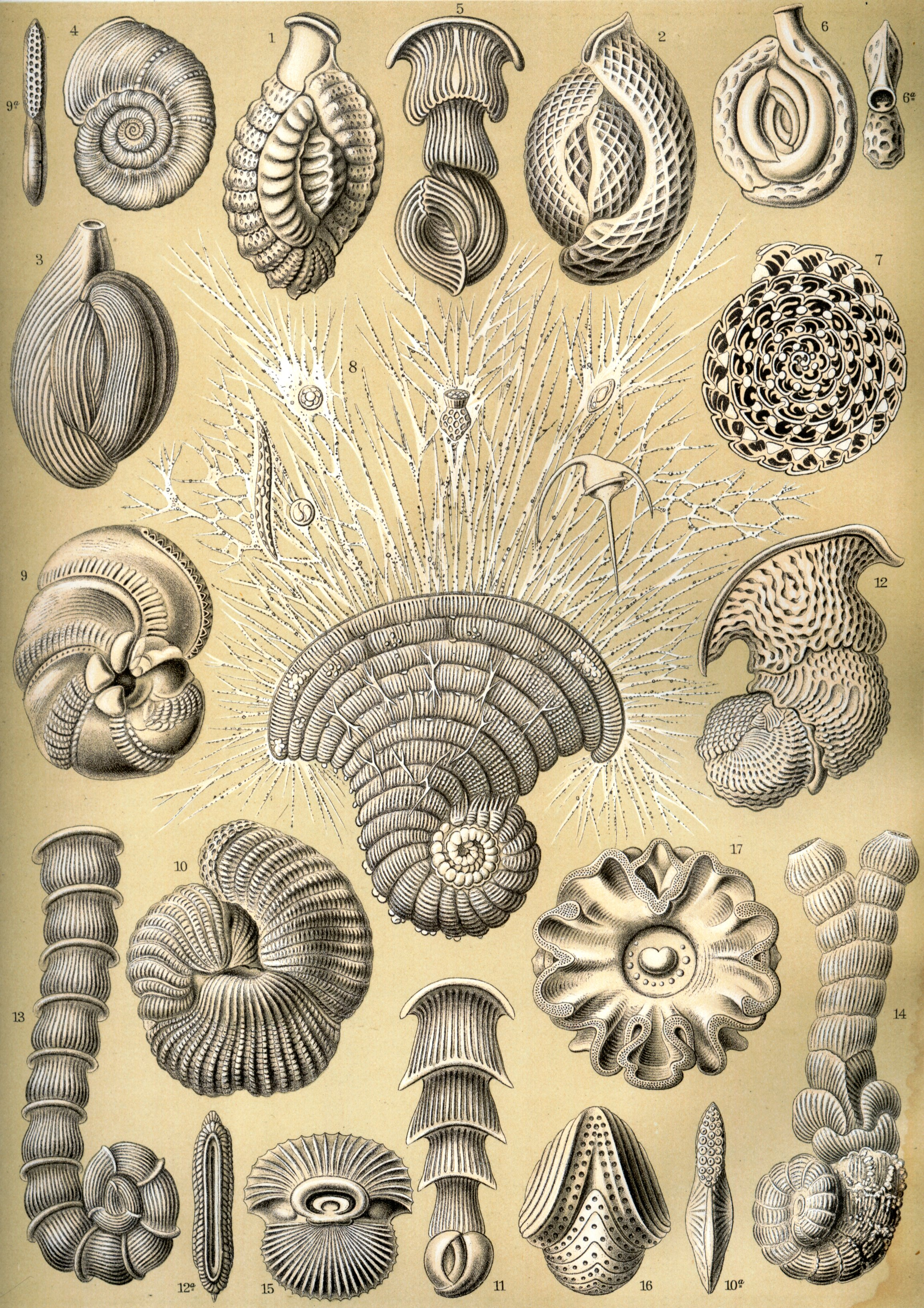
Drawings by Haeckel 1904 (click for details)

Like radiolarians, foraminiferans (forams for short) are single-celled predatory protists, also protected with shells that have holes in them. Their name comes from the Latin for "hole bearers". Their shells, often called tests, are chambered (forams add more chambers as they grow). The shells are usually made of calcite, but are sometimes made of agglutinated sediment particles or chiton, and (rarely) of silica. Most forams are benthic, but about 40 species are planktic. They are widely researched with well established fossil records which allow scientists to infer a lot about past environments and climates.

Foraminiferans

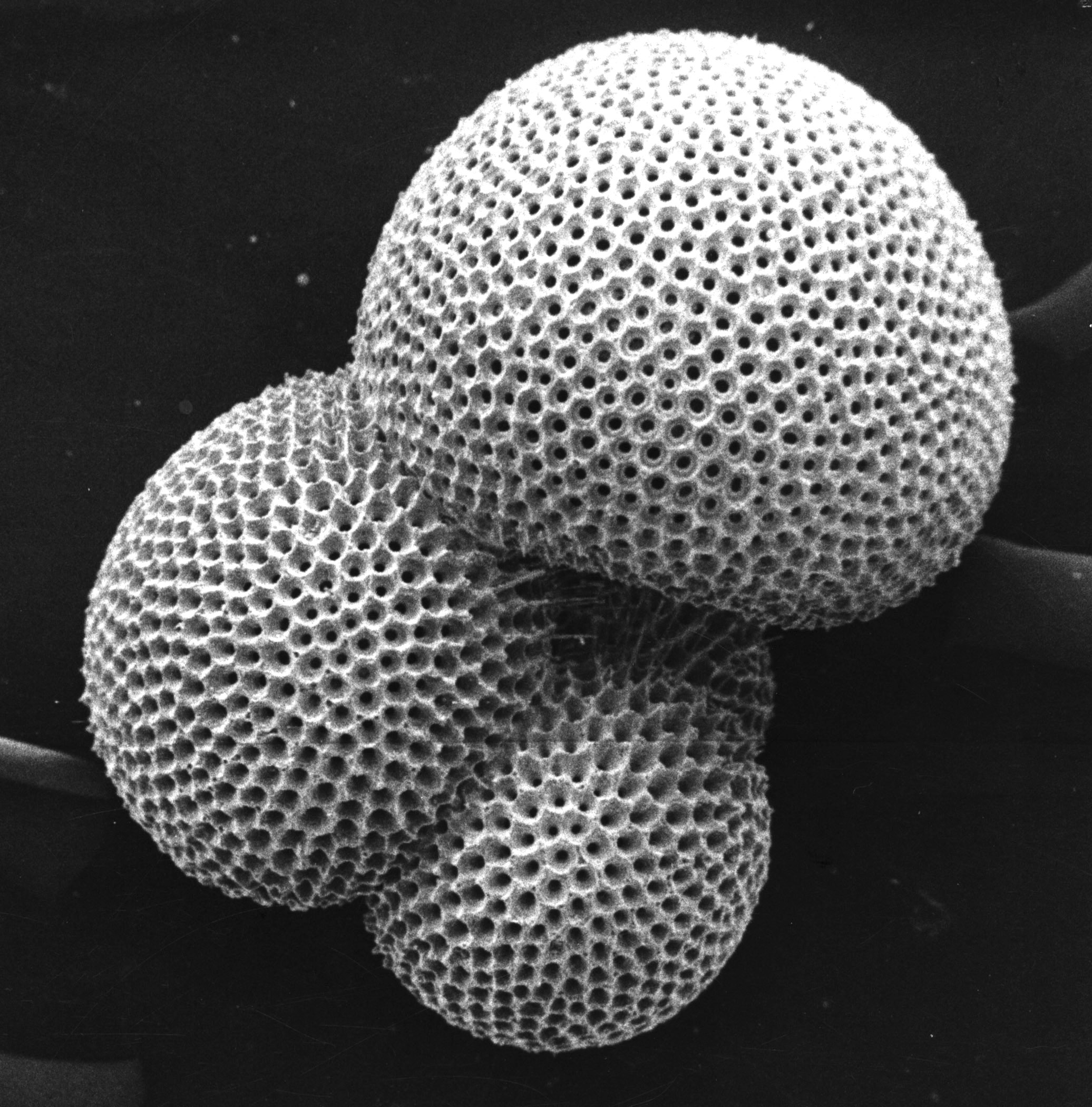
...can have more than one nucleus...

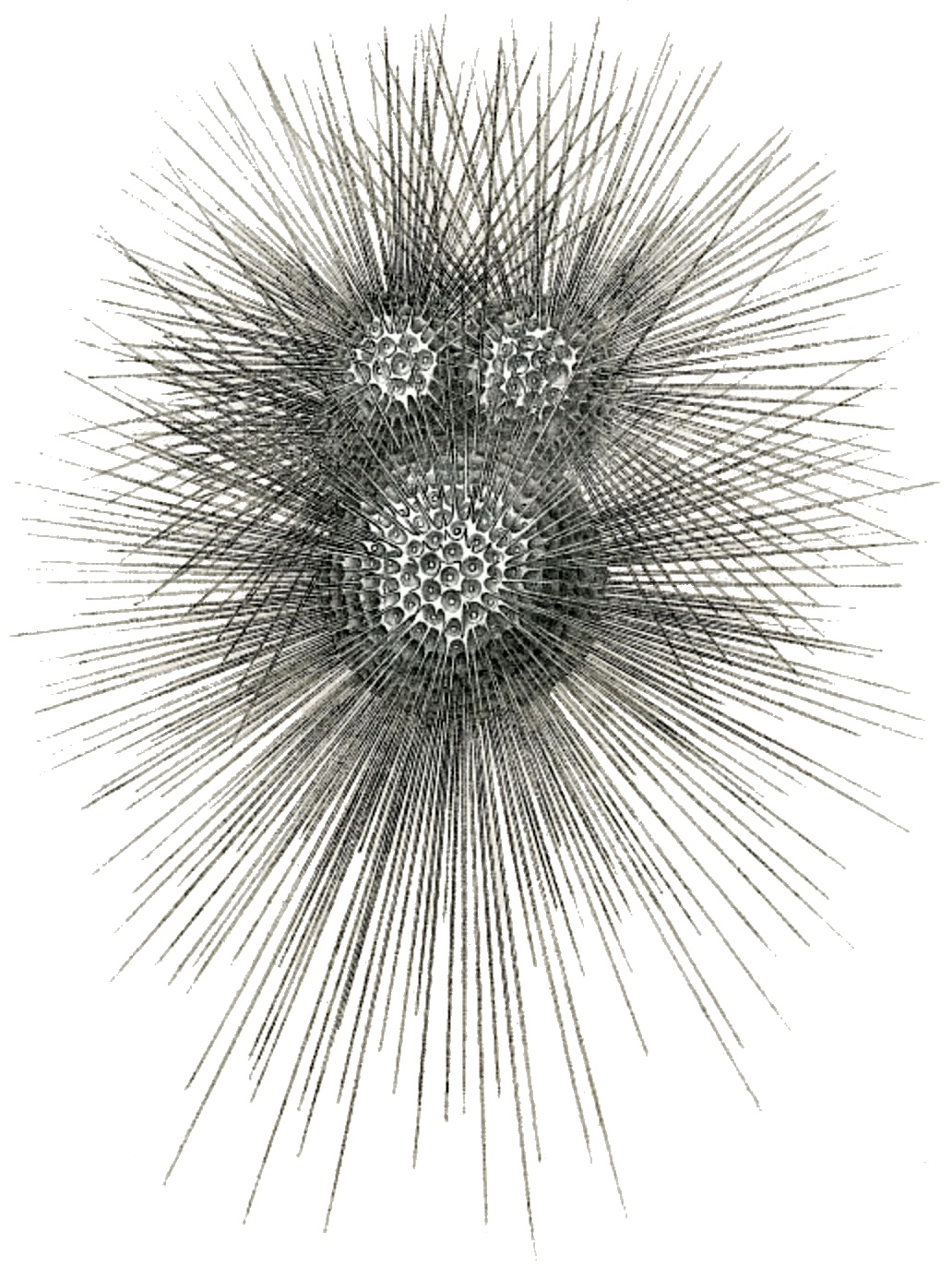
...and defensive spines.

Foraminiferans are important unicellular zooplankton protists, with calcium tests.

External videos
- foraminiferans
- Foraminiferal networks and growth

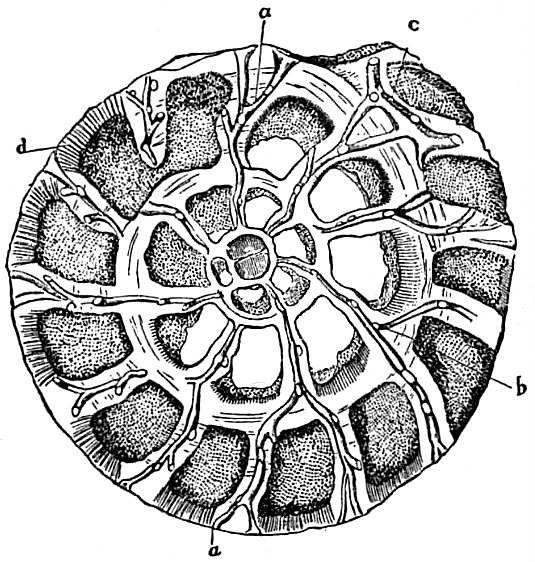
Section showing chambers of a spiral foram

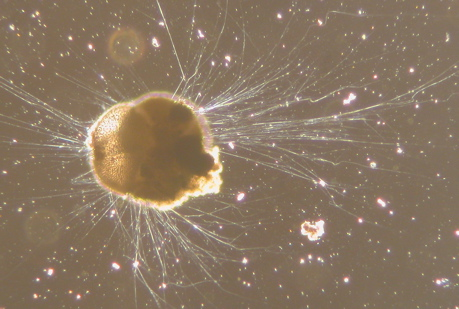
Live Ammonia tepida streaming granular ectoplasm for catching food

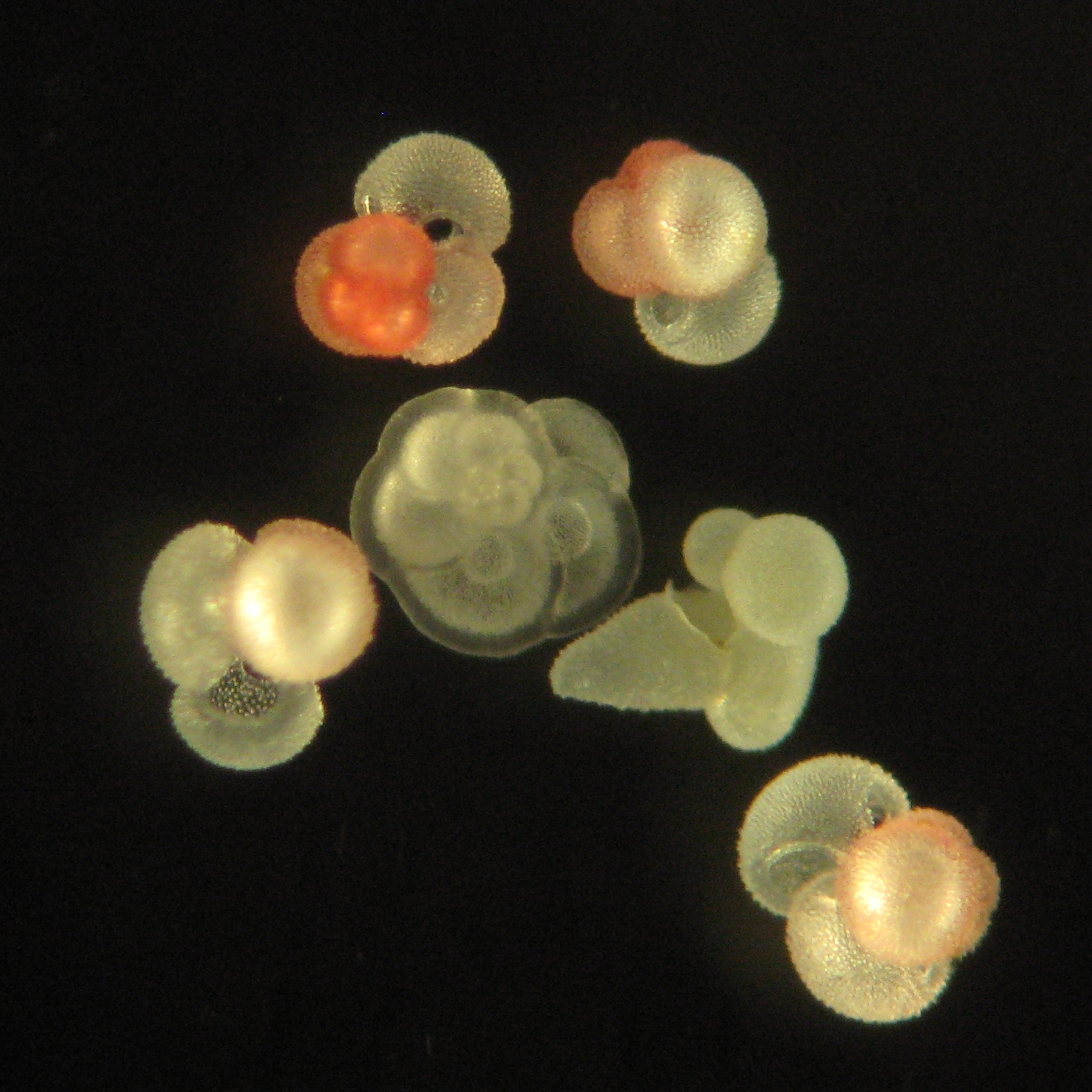
Group of planktonic forams

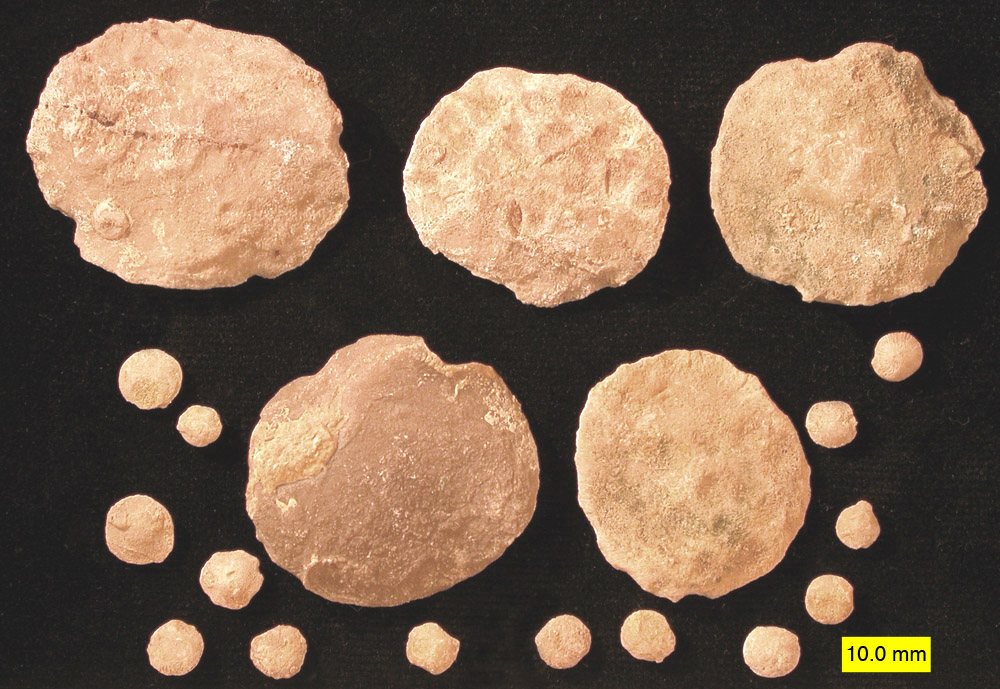
Fossil nummulitid forams of various sizes from the Eocene

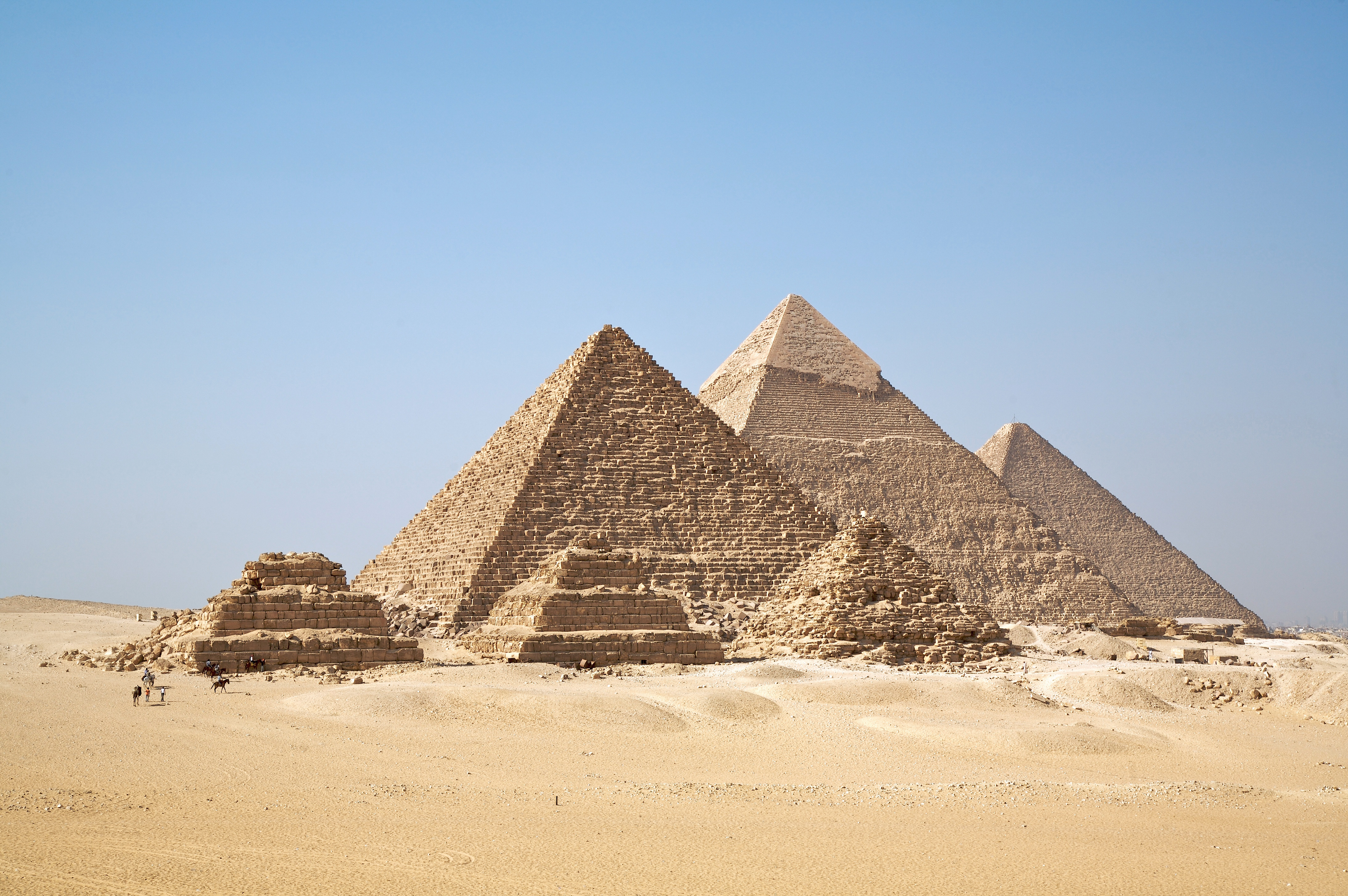
The Egyptian pyramids were constructed from limestone that contained nummulites.

A number of forams are mixotrophic (see below). These have unicellular algae as endosymbionts, from diverse lineages such as the green algae, red algae, golden algae, diatoms, and dinoflagellates. Mixotrophic foraminifers are particularly common in nutrient-poor oceanic waters. Some forams are kleptoplastic, retaining chloroplasts from ingested algae to conduct photosynthesis.

=== Amoeba ===
Shelled and naked amoeba

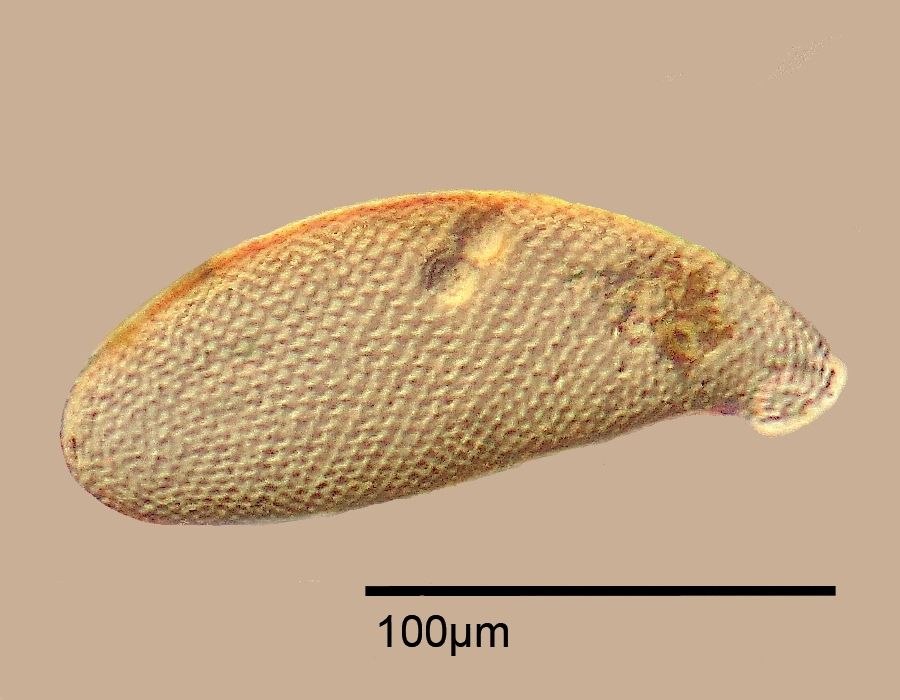
Testate amoeba, Cyphoderia sp.

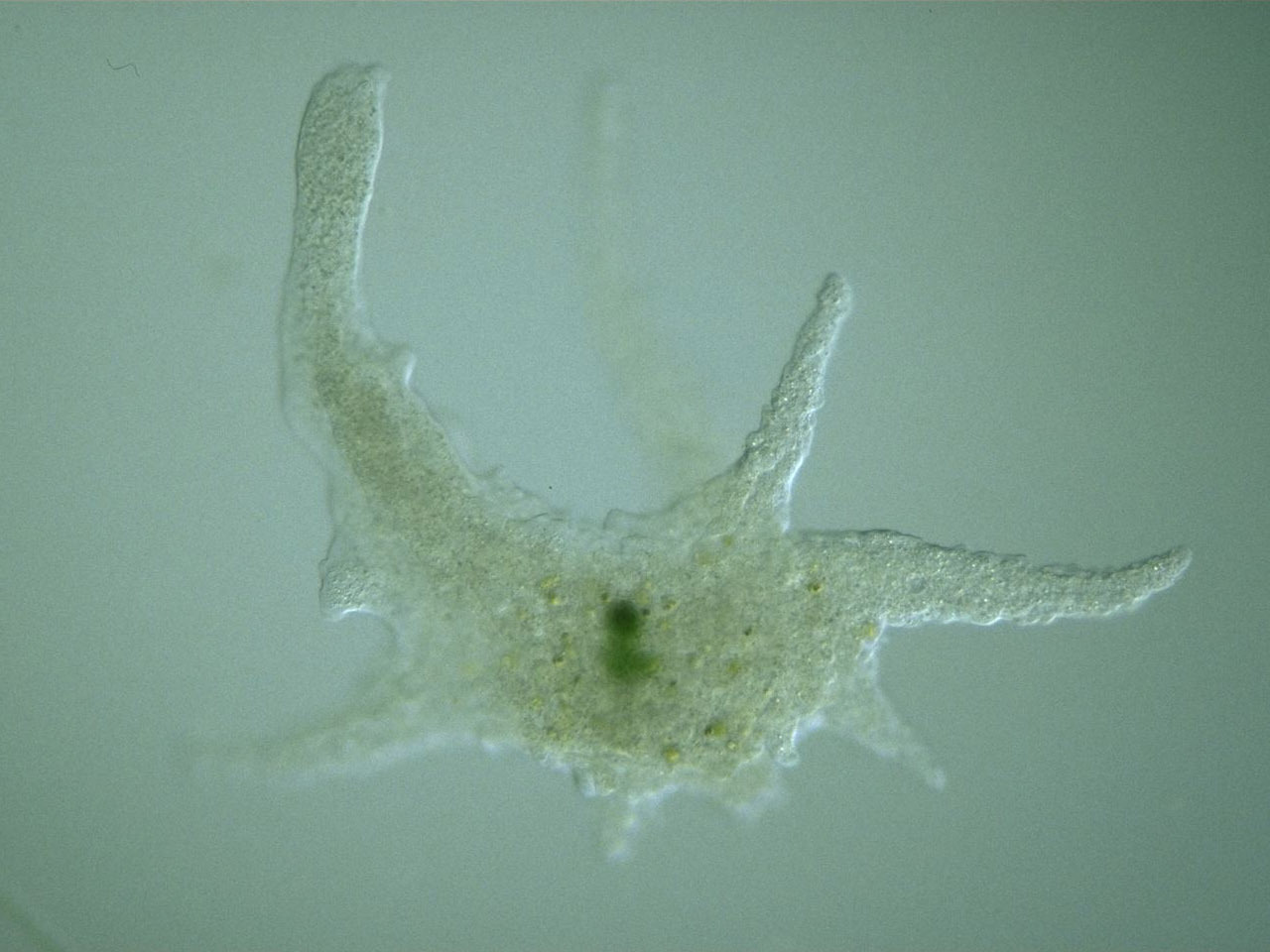
Naked amoeba, Chaos sp.

Amoeba can be shelled (having a test) or naked.
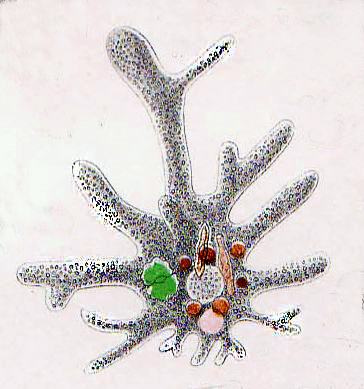
Naked amoeba showing food vacuoles and ingested diatom

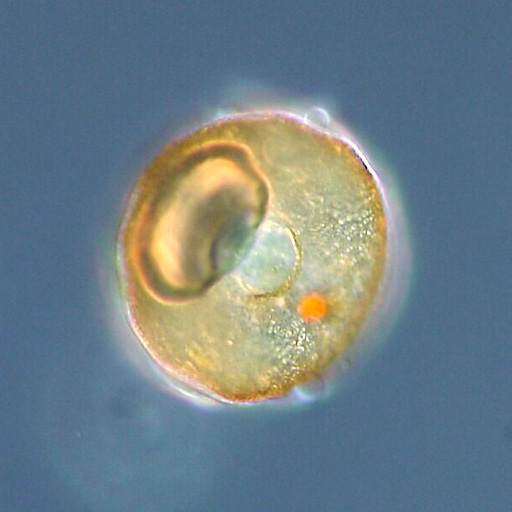
Shell or test of a testate amoeba, Arcella sp.

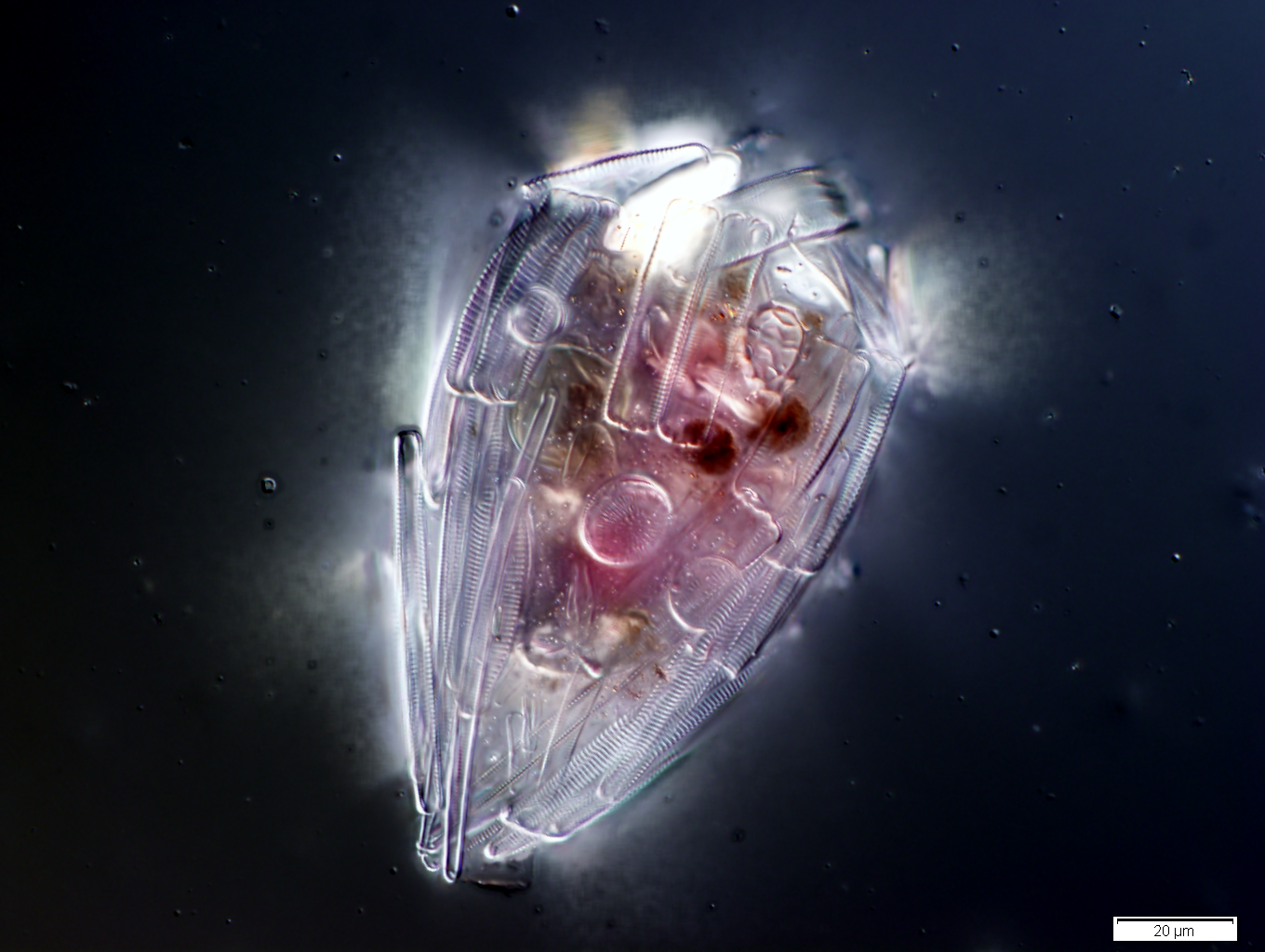
Xenogenic testate amoeba covered in diatoms (from Penard's Amoeba Collection)

Amoeba engulfing a diatom

External videos
- Amoebas
- Testate amoebas
- Feeding amoebas

=== Ciliates ===
Ciliate shapes
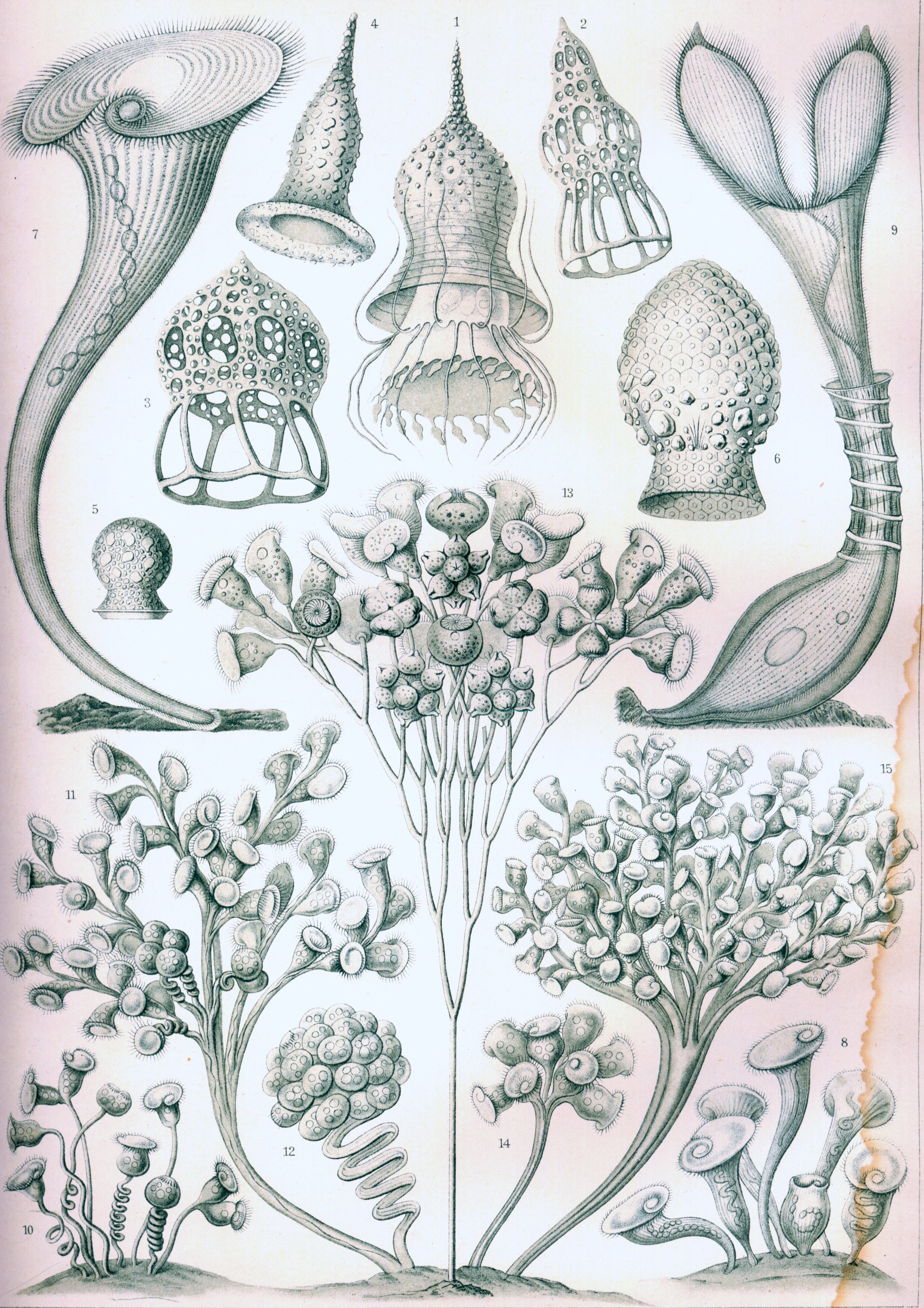
Drawings by Haeckel 1904 (click for details)

Marine ciliates are major grazers of the phytoplankton.

Phytoplankton primary production supports higher trophic levels and fuels microbial remineralization. The dominant pelagic grazers of phytoplankton are typically associated with distinct operating modes of the food web compartments and nutrient cycling. Heterotrophic protist grazers and microzooplankton dominance is usually associated with the microbial loop and regenerated production; while mesozooplankton is associated with a linear food chain and export production. Grazing on particulate primary production in the global ocean surface is ~10–15% for mesozooplankton and 59–75% for microzooplankton, with estimates for coastal and estuarine systems usually in the a lower range.

Ciliates constitute an important component of the microzooplankton community with preference for small-sized preys, in contrast to mesozooplankton, and many ciliate species are also grazed by mesozooplankton. Thus, ciliates can be an important link between small cells and higher trophic levels. Besides their significant role in carbon transfer, ciliates are also considered high quality food, as a source of proteinaceous compounds with a low C:N ratio in comparison to phytoplankton.

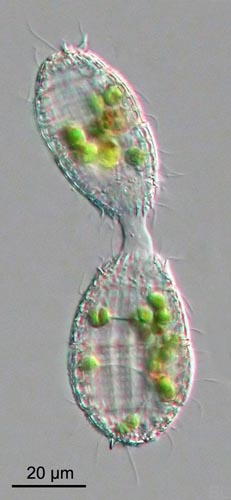
Conjugation of two Coleps sp. Two similar-looking but sexually distinct partners connected at their front ends exchange genetic material via a plasma bridge.

Although many ciliates are heterotrophs, a number of pelagic species are mixotrophic, combining both phagotrophic and phototrophic nutrition (Stoecker, 1998). The recognition of mixotrophy in the marine plankton food web has challenged the classical understanding of pelagic food webs, as autotrophy and heterotrophy are not necessarily two distinct functional compartments. Classical understanding of ecological interactions among plankton, such as competition for nutrients, indicates that nutrient uptake affinity decreases with organism size, favoring smaller sizes under resource limiting conditions. Mixotrophy is advantageous to organisms under nutrient limited conditions, allowing them to reduce direct competition by grazing on smaller prey and increase direct ingestion of nutrients. Modeling results suggest that mixotrophy favors larger organisms, and therefore enhances trophic transfer efficiency. On top of that, mixotrophy appears to be important over both, space and time, in marine systems. stressing the need for ecological field studies to further elucidate the role of mixotrophy.

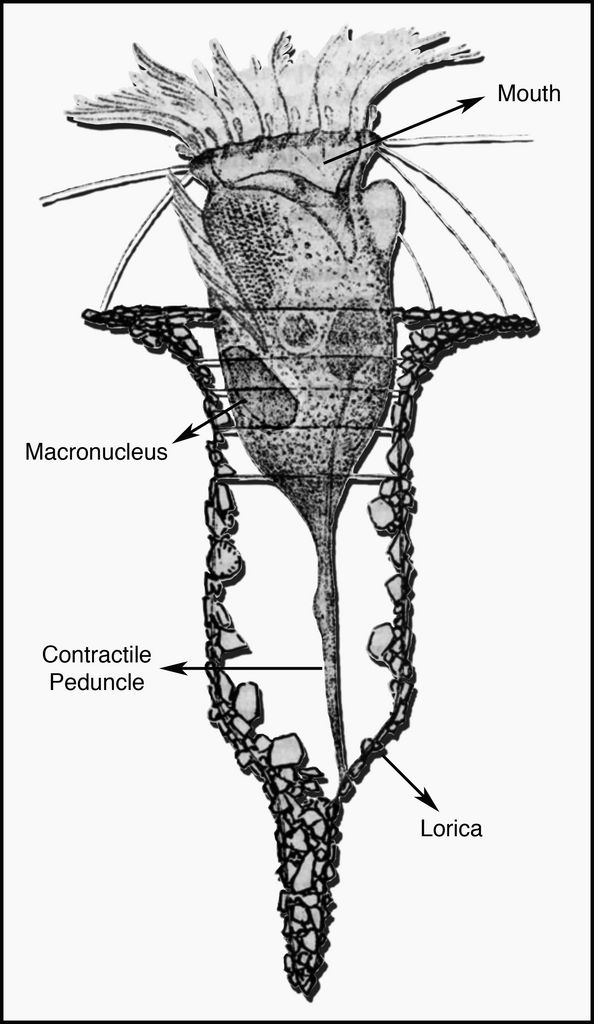
Tintinnopsis campanula

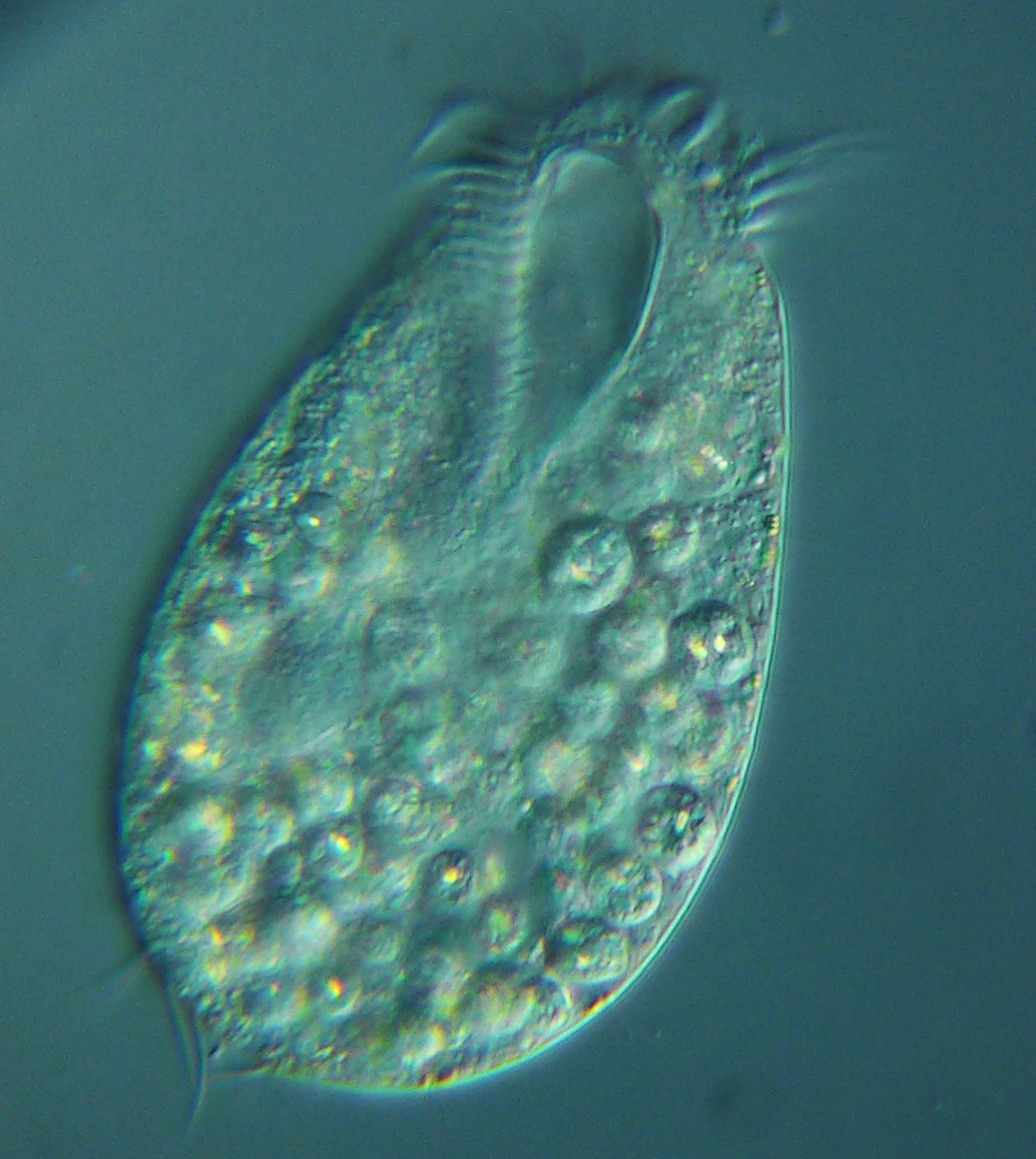
Oxytricha chlorelligera

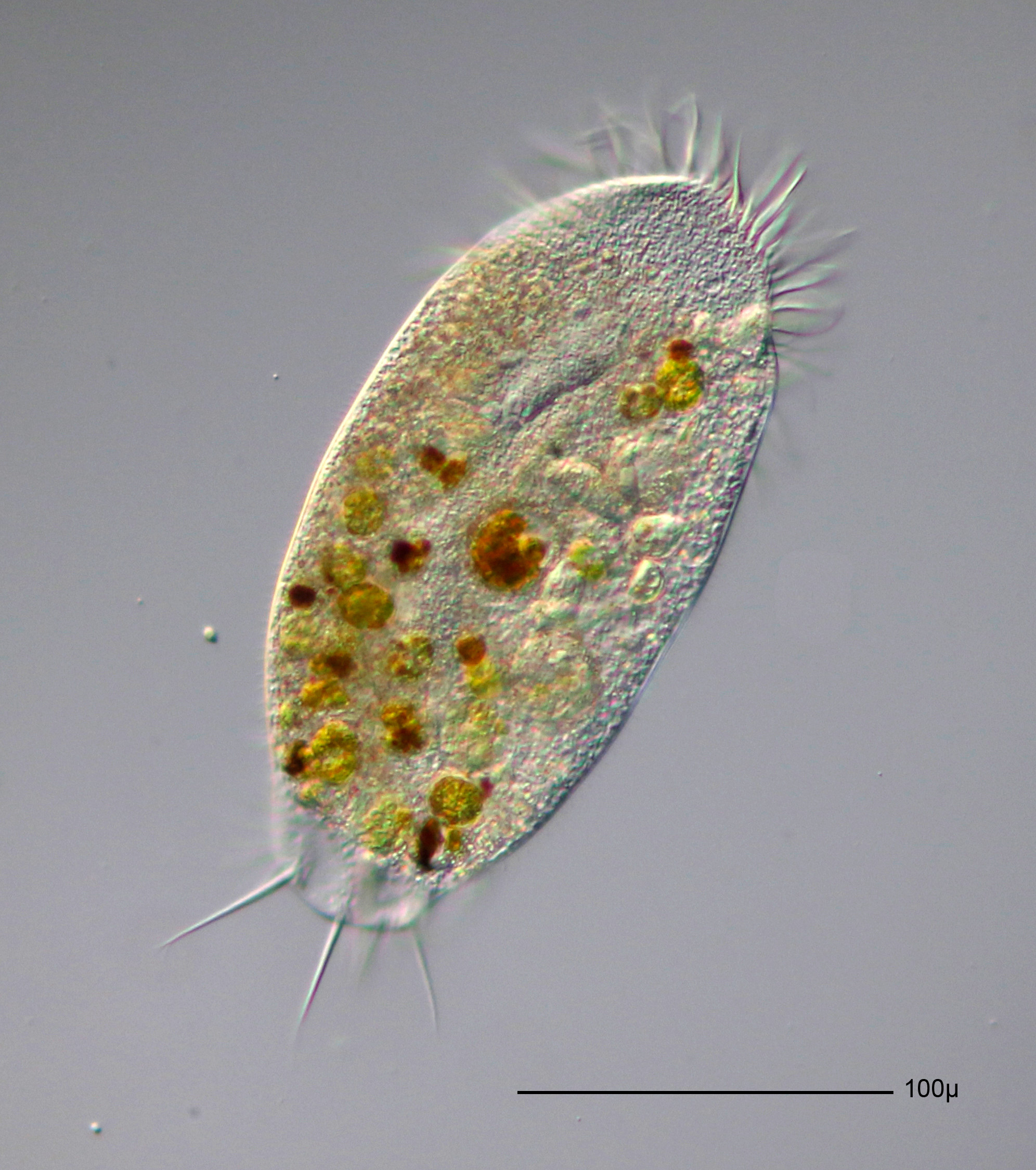
Stylonychia putrina

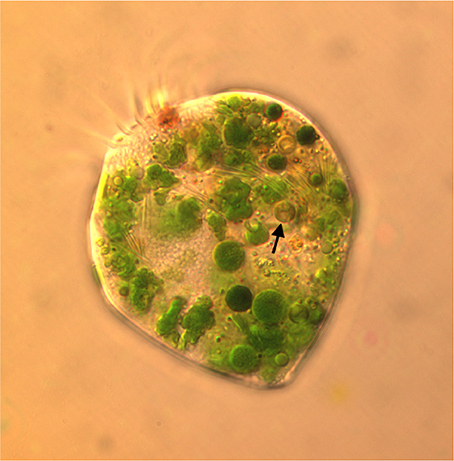
The marine ciliate Strombidium rassoulzadegani
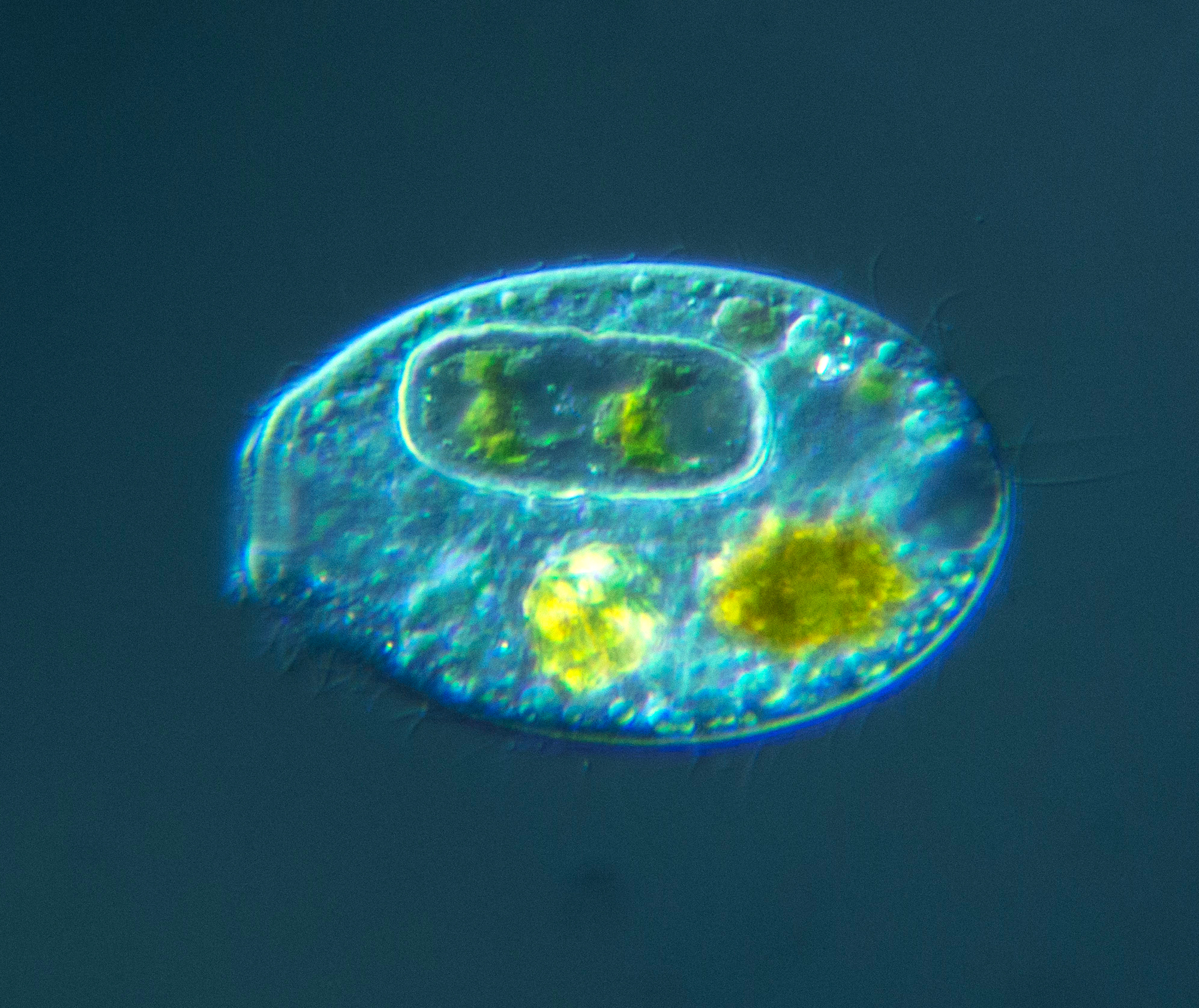
Holophyra ovum

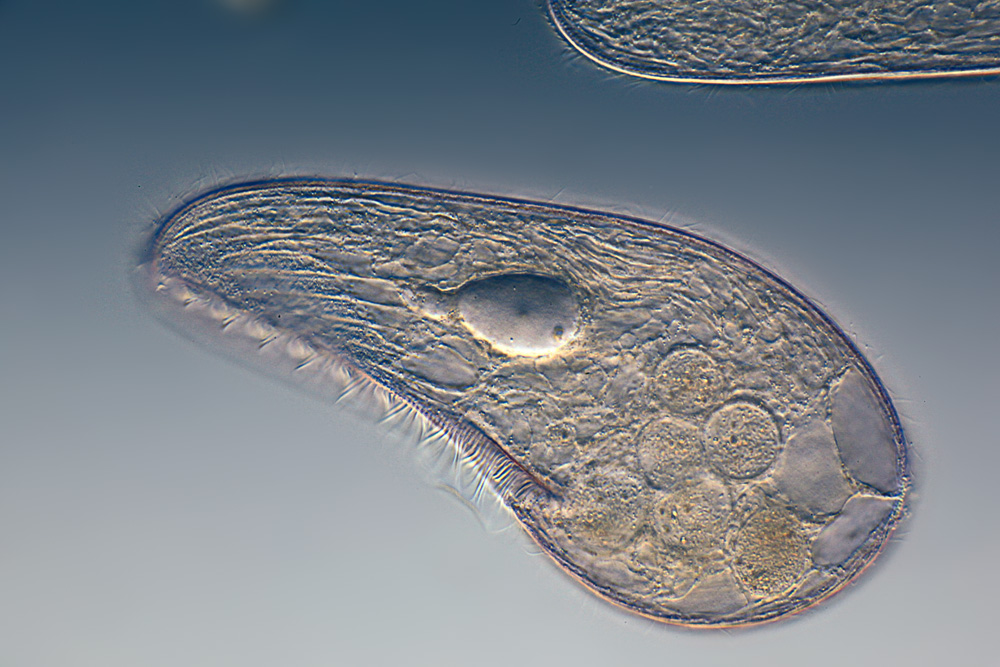
Blepharisma japonicum
Several taxa of ciliates interacting

Blepharisma americanum swimming in a drop of pond water with other microorganisms

External videos
- Peritrich Ciliates
- Conjugating protists

== Macroscopic protists ==
Macroscopic protists (see also unicellular macroalgae&nbsp;→&nbsp;)

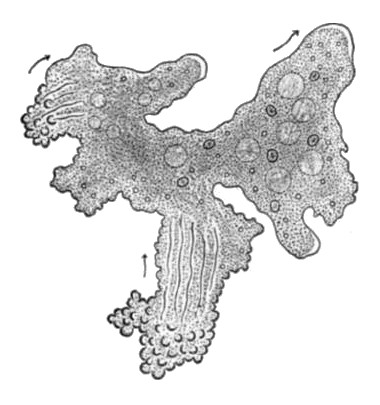
The single-celled giant amoeba has up to 1000 nuclei and reaches lengths of 5 mm.

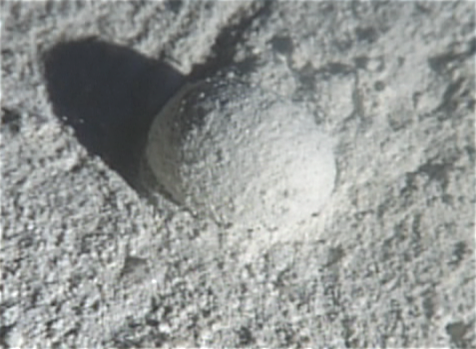
Gromia sphaerica is a large spherical testate amoeba which makes mud trails. Its diameter is up to 3.8 cm.

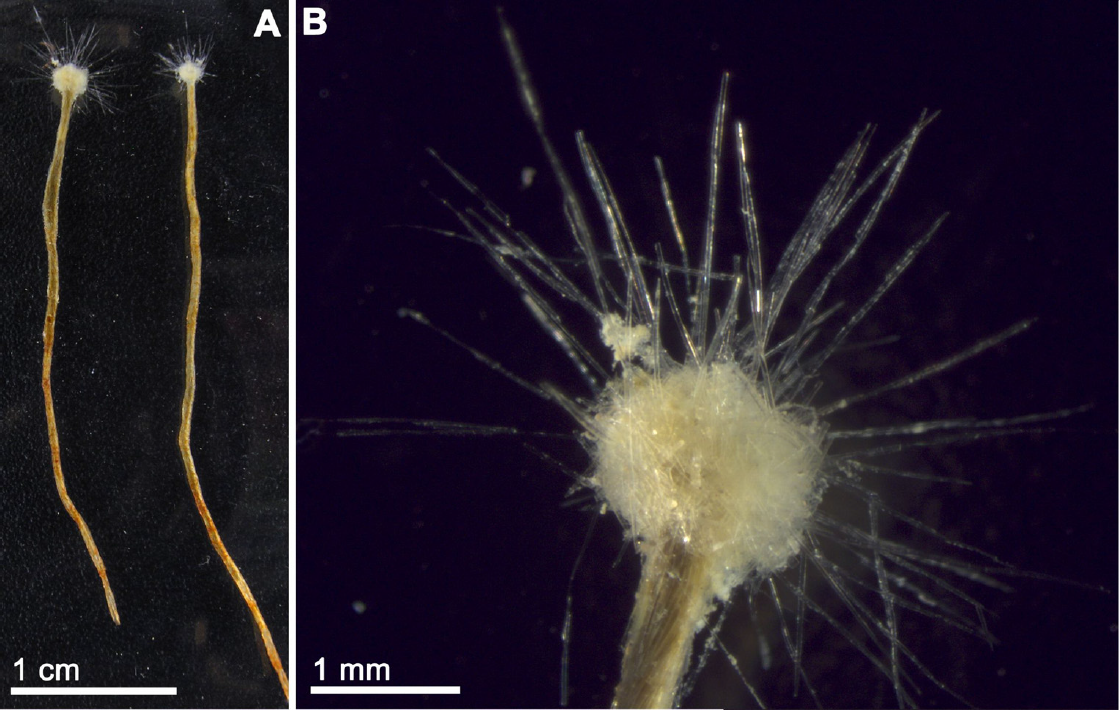
Spiculosiphon oceana, a unicellular foraminiferan with an appearance and lifestyle that mimics a sponge, grows to 5 cm long.

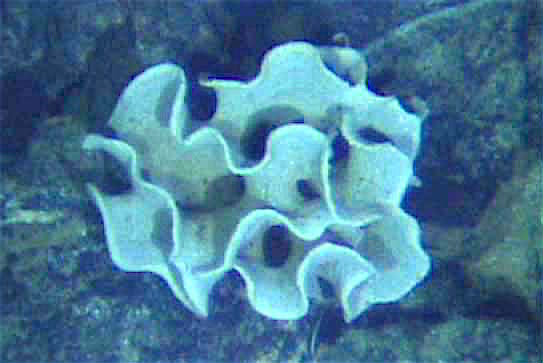
The xenophyophore, another single-celled foraminiferan, lives in abyssal zones. It has a giant shell up to 20 cm across.

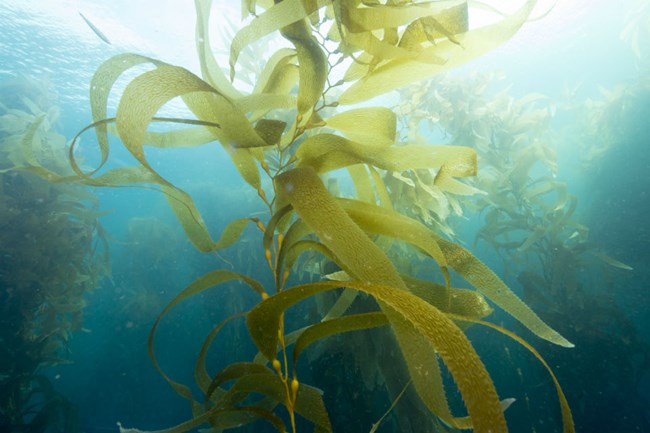
Giant kelp, a brown algae, is not a true plant, yet it is multicellular and can grow to 50 m.

== Planktonic protists ==
=== Interactome ===
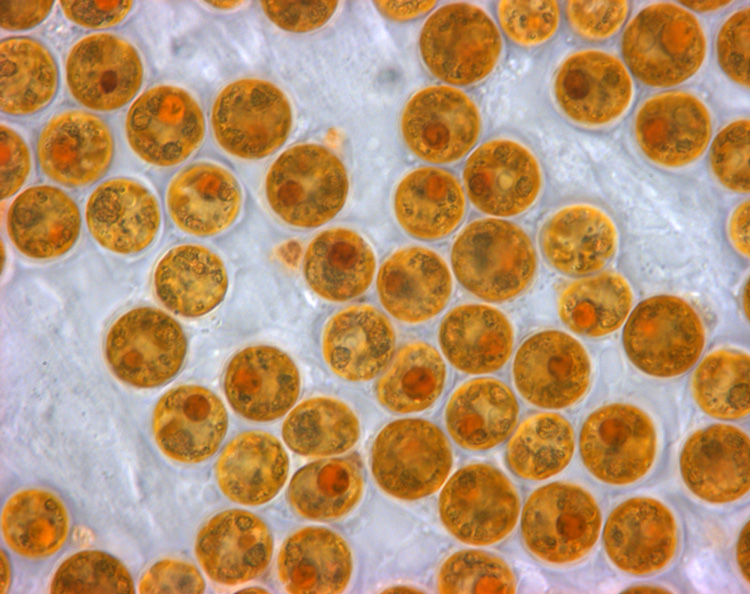
Yellow-brown zooxanthellae, a photosynthetic algae that lives inside hosts like radiolarians and coral

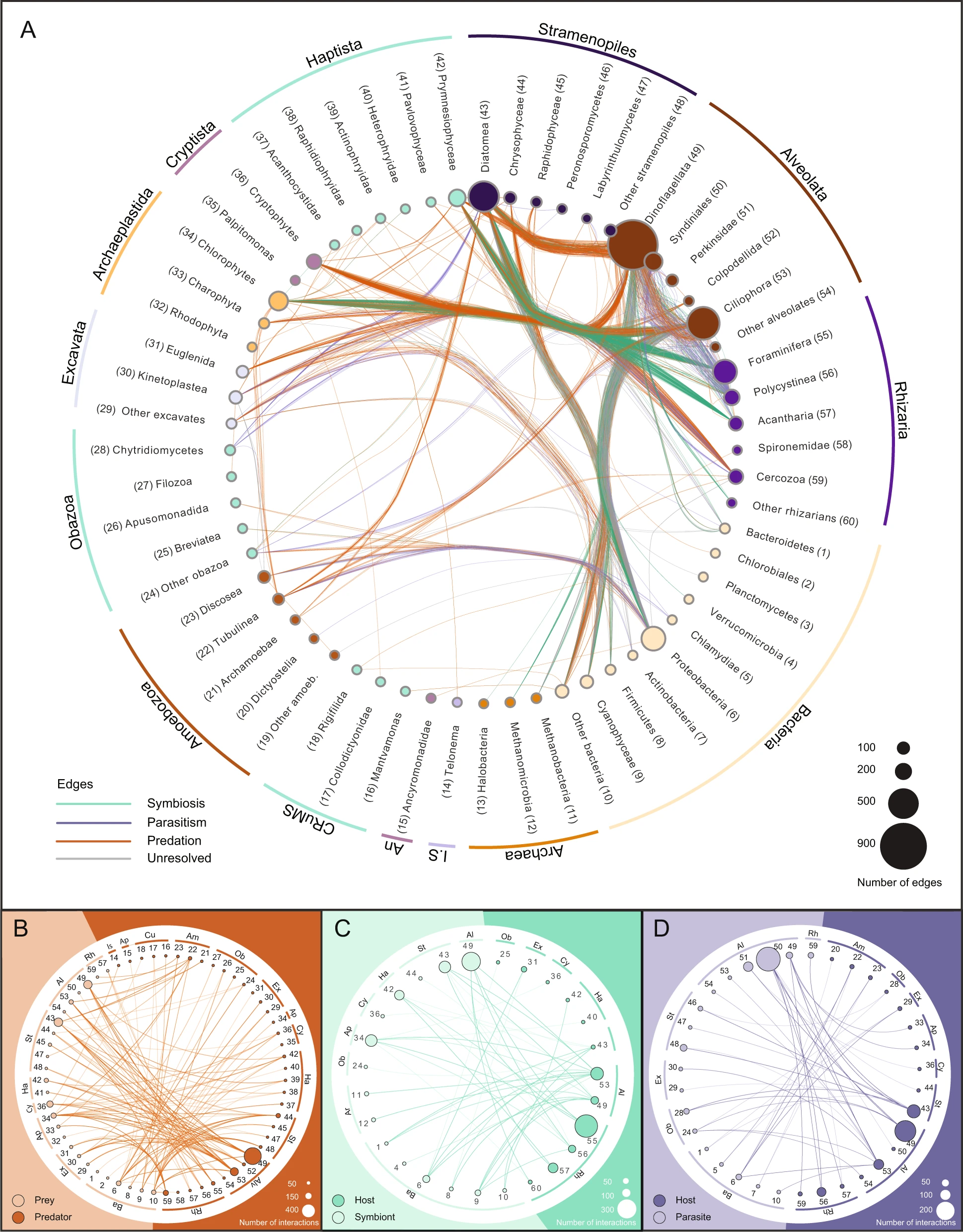
Planktonic protist interactome Bipartite networks, providing an overview of the interactions represented by a manually curated Protist Interaction DAtabase (PIDA)

Interaction between microbial species has played important roles in evolution and speciation. One of the best examples is that the origin of eukaryotes is grounded in the interaction-events of endosymbiosis; giving rise to mitochondria, chloroplasts, and other metabolic capacities in the eukaryotic cell, Microbial interactions guarantee ecosystem function, having crucial roles in, for instance, carbon channeling in photosymbiosis, control of microalgae blooms by parasites, and phytoplankton-associated bacteria influencing the growth and health of their host.

Despite their importance, understanding of microbial interactions in the ocean and other aquatic systems is rudimentary, and the majority of them are still unknown. The earliest surveys of interactions between aquatic microbes date back to the 19th century. In 1851, while on board HMS Rattlesnake in the Pacific Ocean, Thomas Huxley discovered small yellow–green cells inside the conspicuous planktonic radiolarians which he thought were organelles. Later, Karl Brandt established the yellowish cells were symbiotic alga and named them zooxanthella. Since these early studies, hundreds of others have reported microbial interactions by using classic tools, mainly microscopy, but this knowledge has not yet been gathered into one accessible database. In recent years the high throughput sequencing (HTS) of environmental DNA or RNA has transformed understanding of microbial diversity and evolution, as well as generating hypotheses on microbial interactions based on correlations of estimated microbial abundances over spatiotemporal scales.

The diagram on the right is an overview of the interactions between planktonic protists recorded in a manually curated Protist Interaction DAtabase (PIDA). The network is based on 2422 ecological interactions in the PIDA registered from ~500 publications spanning the last 150 years. The nomenclature and taxonomic order of Eukaryota is based on Adl et al. 2019. The nomenclature and taxonomic order of Bacteria is based on Schultz et al. 2017.

The nodes are grouped (outer circle) according to eukaryotic supergroups (or Incertae sedis), Bacteria and Archaea. All major protistan lineages were involved in interactions as hosts, symbionts (mutualists and commensalists), parasites, predators, and/or prey. Predation was the most common interaction (39%), followed by symbiosis (29%), parasitism (18%), and unresolved interactions (14%, where it is uncertain whether the interaction is beneficial or antagonistic). Nodes represent eukaryotic and prokaryotic taxa and are colored accordingly. Node size indicates the number of edges/links that are connected to that node. Each node/taxon is assigned a number, which corresponds with the numbers for taxa in B, C and D. Edges represent interactions between two taxa and are colored according to ecological interaction type: predation (orange), symbiosis (green), and parasitism (purple).

The network is undirected, meaning that a node can contain both parasites/symbionts/prey and hosts/predators. To avoid cluttering of the figure, "Self-loops", which represent cases where both interacting organisms belong to the same taxon (e.g., a dinoflagellate eating another dinoflagellate) are not shown as edges/links in this figure, but are considered in the size of nodes. The outermost circle groups taxa in the different eukaryotic 'supergroups' or the prokaryotic domains Bacteria and Archaea. Ancryomonadidae is abbreviated An. Telonema is not placed into any of the supergroups, but classified as Incertae sedis (abbreviated I.S. in the figure). In B, B, and D the following abbreviations for supergroups are used: Ar Archaea, Ba Bacteria, Rh Rhizaria, Al Alveolata, St Stramenopiles, Ha Haptista, Cy Cryptista, Ap Archaeplastida, Ex Excavata, Ob Obazoa, Am Amoebozoa, Cu CRuMS, An Ancryomonadidae, Is Incertae sedis.

B: Predator–prey interactions in PIDA. The node numbers correspond to taxa node numbers in a. Abbreviations for supergroups are described above. Background and nodes are colored according to functional role in the interaction: Prey are colored light orange (left part of figure), while predators are depicted in dark orange (right part of figure). The size of each node represents the number of edges connected to that node.

C. Symbiont–host interactions included in PIDA. The node numbers correspond to node numbers in A. Abbreviations for supergroups are described above. Symbionts are to the left, colored light green, and their hosts are to the right in dark green. The size of each node represents the number of edges connected to that node.

D: Parasite–host interactions included in PIDA. The node numbers correspond to node numbers in A. Abbreviations for supergroups are described above. Parasite taxa are depicted in light purple (left), hosts in dark purple (right).

It was found that protist predators seem to be "multivorous" while parasite–host and symbiont–host interactions appear to have moderate degrees of specialization. The SAR supergroup (i.e., Stramenopiles, Alveolata, and Rhizaria) heavily dominated PIDA, and comparisons against a global-ocean molecular survey (Tara expedition) indicated that several SAR lineages, which are abundant and diverse in the marine realm, were underrepresented among the recorded interactions.

== Protist shells ==
Many protists have protective shells or tests, usually made from calcium carbonate (chalk) or silica (glass). Protists are mostly single-celled and microscopic. Their shells are often tough mineralised forms that resist degradation, and can survive the death of the protist as a microfossil. Although protists are very small, they are ubiquitous. Their numbers are such that their shells play a huge part in the formation of ocean sediments, and in the global cycling of elements and nutrients.

Diatom shells are called frustules and are made from silica. These glass structures have accumulated for over 100 million years leaving rich deposits of nano and microstructured silicon oxide in the form of diatomaceous earth around the globe. The evolutionary causes for the generation of nano and microstructured silica by photosynthetic algae are not yet clear. However, in 2018 it was shown that reflection of ultraviolet light by nanostructured silica protects the DNA in the algal cells, and this may be an evolutionary cause for the formation of the glass cages.

Coccolithophores are protected by a shell constructed from ornate circular plates or scales called coccoliths. The coccoliths are made from calcium carbonate or chalk. The term coccolithophore derives from the Greek for a seed carrying stone, referring to their small size and the coccolith stones they carry.

Diatoms

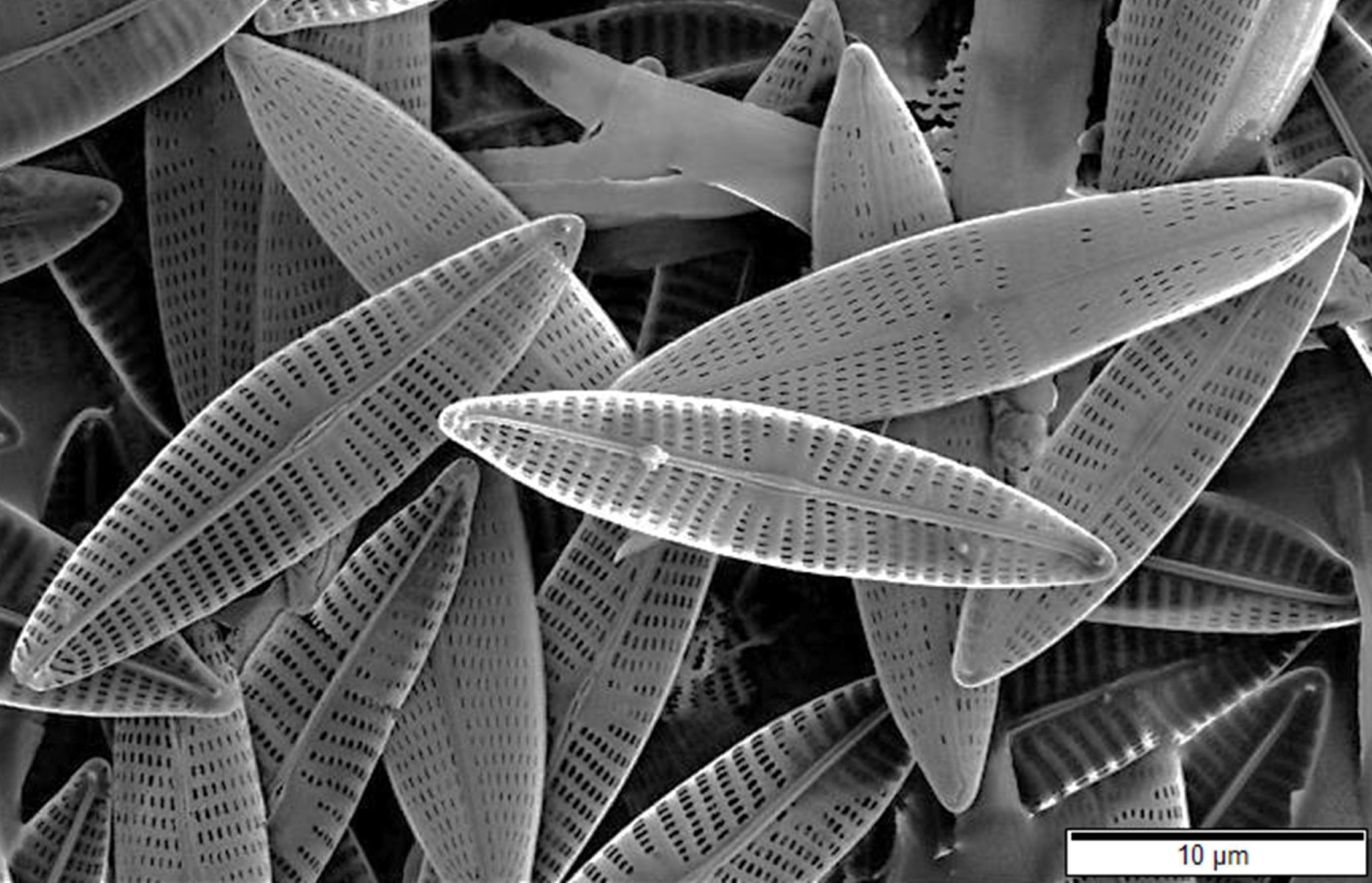
Diatoms, major components of marine plankton, have glass skeletons called frustules. "The microscopic structures of diatoms help them manipulate light, leading to hopes they could be used in new technologies for light detection, computing or robotics.

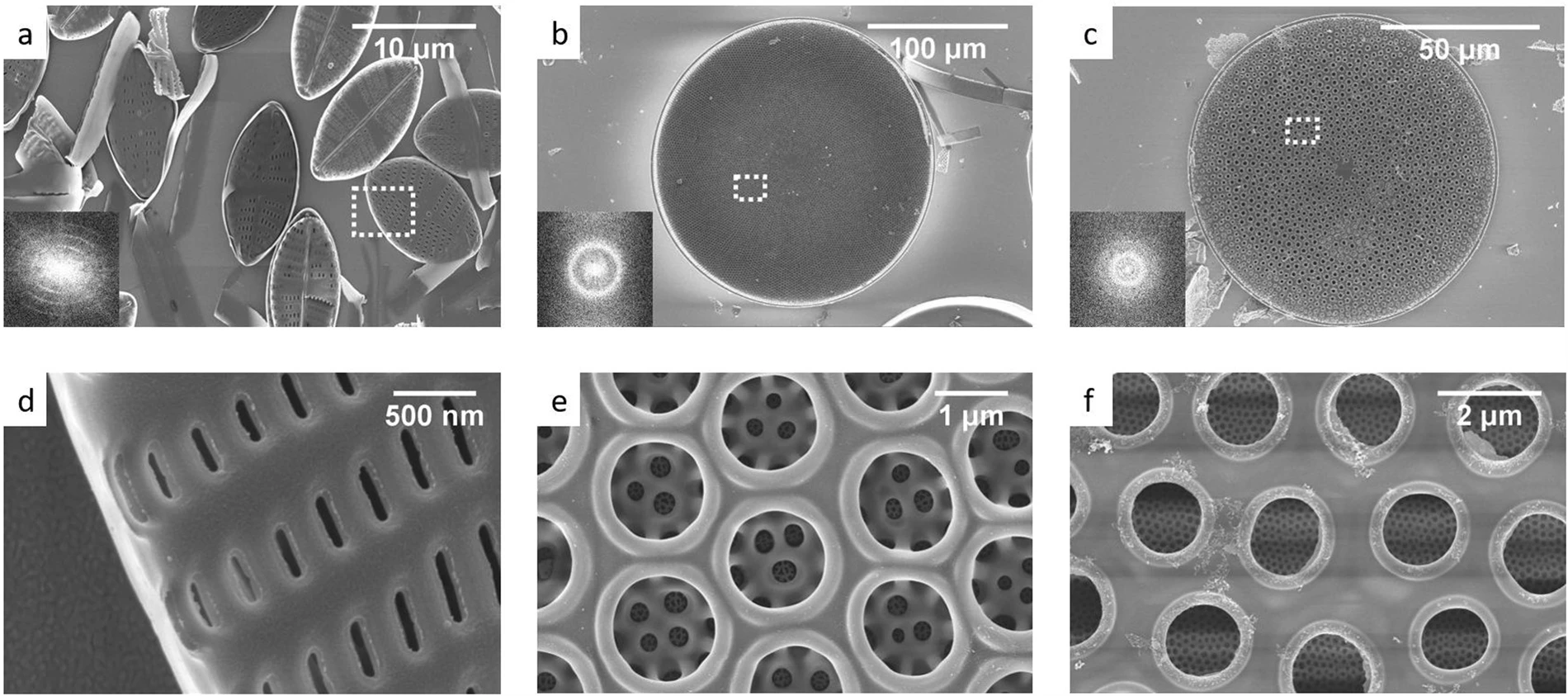
SEM images of pores in diatom frustules

Coccolithophores

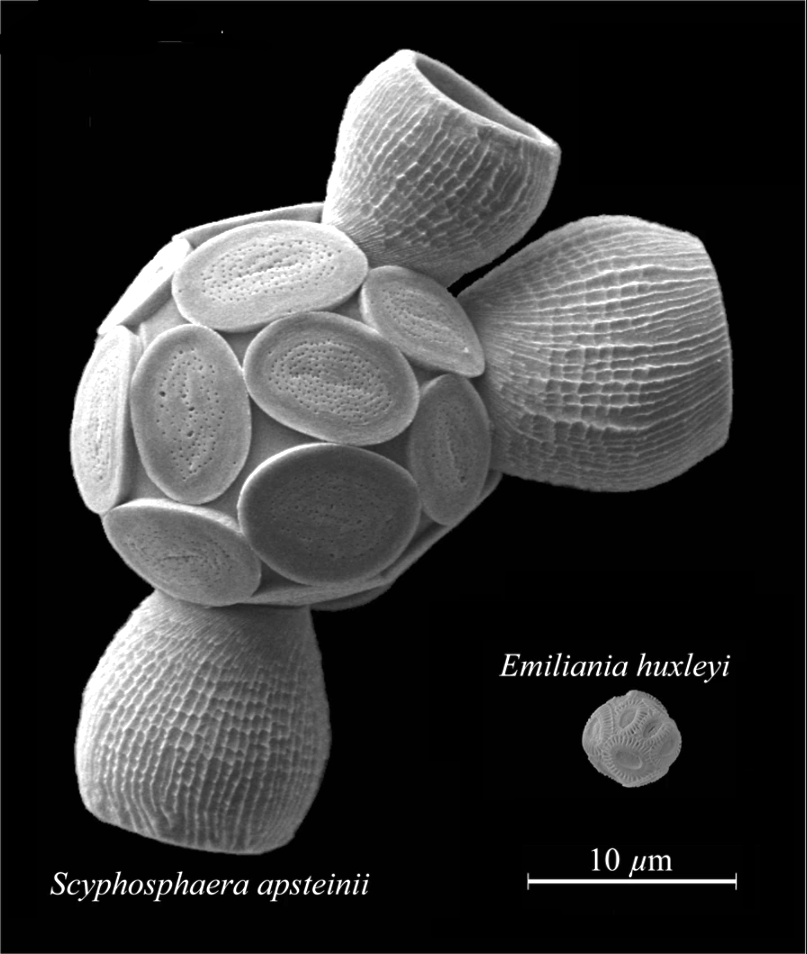
Coccolithophores are armoured with chalk plates or stones called coccoliths. The images above show the size comparison between the relatively large coccolithophore Scyphosphaera apsteinii and the relatively small but ubiquitous Emiliania huxleyi.

Benefits of having shells

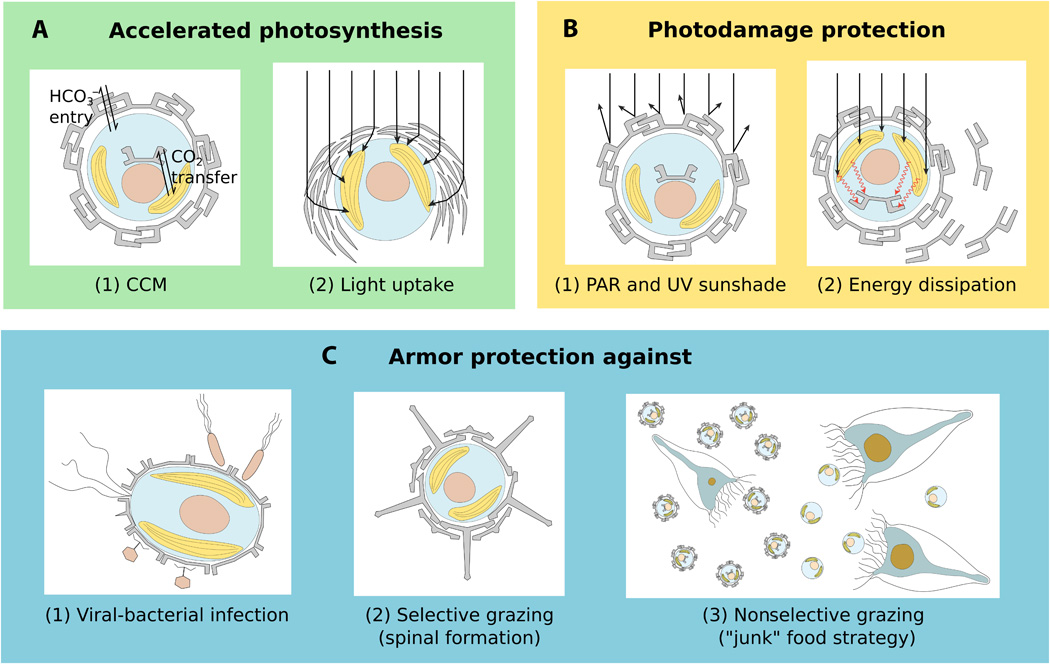
Benefits in coccolithophore calcification – see text below

Costs of having shells

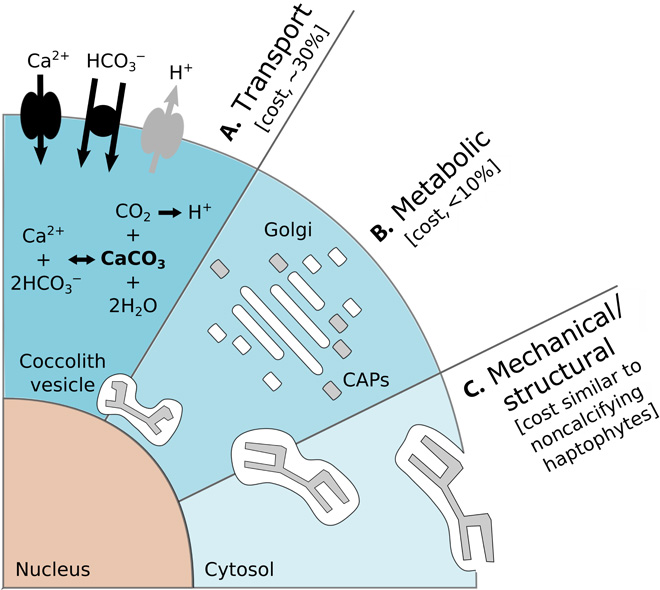
Energetic costs in coccolithophore calcification

There are benefits for protists that carry protective shells. The diagram on the left above shows some benefits coccolithophore get from carrying coccoliths. In the diagram, (A) represents accelerated photosynthesis including carbon concentrating mechanisms (CCM) and enhanced light uptake via scattering of scarce photons for deep-dwelling species. (B) represents protection from photodamage including sunshade protection from ultraviolet light (UV) and photosynthetic active radiation (PAR) and energy dissipation under high-light conditions. (C) represents armour protection includes protection against viral/bacterial infections and grazing by selective and nonselective grazers.

There are also costs for protists that carry protective shells. The diagram on the right above shows some of the energetic costs coccolithophore incur from carrying coccoliths. In the diagram, the energetic costs are reported in percentage of total photosynthetic budget. (A) represents transport processes include the transport into the cell from the surrounding seawater of primary calcification substrates Ca_{2}+ and HCO_{3}− (black arrows) and the removal of the end product H+ from the cell (gray arrow). The transport of Ca_{2}+ through the cytoplasm to the coccolith vesicle (CV) is the dominant cost associated with calcification. (B) represents metabolic processes include the synthesis of coccolith-associated polysaccharides (CAPs – gray rectangles) by the Golgi complex (white rectangles) that regulate the nucleation and geometry of CaCO_{3} crystals. The completed coccolith (gray plate) is a complex structure of intricately arranged CAPs and CaCO_{3} crystals. (C) Mechanical and structural processes account for the secretion of the completed coccoliths that are transported from their original position adjacent to the nucleus to the cell periphery, where they are transferred to the surface of the cell.

== See also ==
- Cavalier-Smith's system of classification

== Further references ==
- Bjorbækmo, Marit F. Markussen; Evenstad, Andreas; Røsæg, Line Lieblein; Krabberød, Anders K.; Logares, Ramiro (2020). "The planktonic protist interactome: Where do we stand after a century of research?". The ISME Journal. 14 (2): 544–559. Bibcode:2020ISMEJ..14..544B. doi:10.1038/s41396-019-0542-5. PMC 6976576. PMID 31685936. Available under a Creative Commons Attribution 4.0 International License.
- Flynn, Kevin J.; Mitra, Aditee; Anestis, Konstantinos; Anschütz, Anna A.; Calbet, Albert; Ferreira, Guilherme Duarte; Gypens, Nathalie; Hansen, Per J.; John, Uwe; Martin, Jon Lapeyra; Mansour, Joost S.; Maselli, Maira; Medić, Nikola; Norlin, Andreas; Not, Fabrice; Pitta, Paraskevi; Romano, Filomena; Saiz, Enric; Schneider, Lisa K.; Stolte, Willem; Traboni, Claudia (2019). "Mixotrophic protists and a new paradigm for marine ecology: Where does plankton research go now?". Journal of Plankton Research. 41 (4): 375–391. doi:10.1093/plankt/fbz026. hdl:10261/192145.
- Leles, Suzana Gonçalves; Polimene, Luca; Bruggeman, Jorn; Blackford, Jeremy; Ciavatta, Stefano; Mitra, Aditee; Flynn, Kevin John (2018). "Modelling mixotrophic functional diversity and implications for ecosystem function". Journal of Plankton Research. 40 (6): 627–642. doi:10.1093/plankt/fby044.
- Keeling, Patrick J.; Campo, Javier del (2017). "Marine Protists Are Not Just Big Bacteria". Current Biology. 27 (11). Elsevier BV: R541–R549. Bibcode:2017CBio...27.R541K. doi:10.1016/j.cub.2017.03.075. ISSN 0960-9822. PMID 28586691. S2CID 207052528.
