= Microfossil =

Fossil that requires the use of a microscope to see

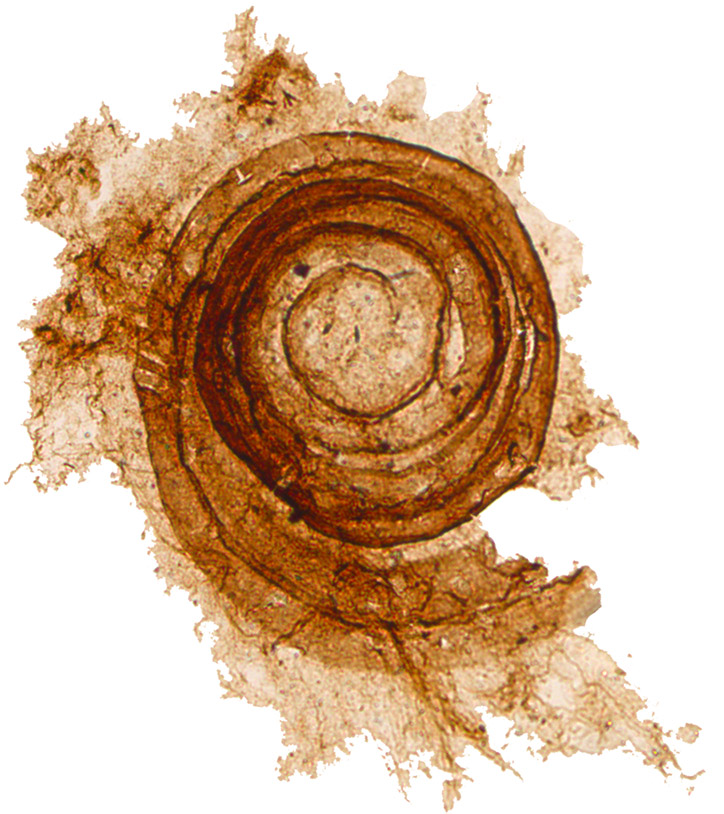
An enigmatic carbonaceous microfossil, Cochleatina canilovica, from the Late Ediacaran

A microfossil is a fossil that is generally between one micrometre and one millimetre in size, the visual study of which requires the use of light or electron microscopy. A fossil which can be studied with the naked eye or low-powered magnification, such as a hand lens, is referred to as a macrofossil.

Microfossils are a common feature of the geological record, from the Precambrian to the Holocene. They are most common in deposits of marine environments, but also occur in brackish water, fresh water and terrestrial sedimentary deposits. While every kingdom of life is represented in the microfossil record, the most abundant forms are protist skeletons or microbial cysts from Chrysophyta, Pyrrhophyta, Sarcodina, acritarchs and chitinozoans, together with pollen and spores from vascular plants.

== Overview ==
A microfossil is a descriptive term applied to fossilized plants and animals whose size is just at or below the level at which the fossil can be analyzed by the naked eye. A commonly applied cutoff point between "micro" and "macro" fossils is 1 mm. Microfossils may either be complete (or near-complete) organisms in themselves (such as the marine plankters foraminifera and coccolithophores) or component parts (such as small teeth or spores) of larger animals or plants. Microfossils are of critical importance as a reservoir of paleoclimate information, and are also commonly used by biostratigraphers to assist in the correlation of rock units.

Microfossils are found in rocks and sediments as the microscopic remains of what were once life forms such as plants, animals, fungus, protists, bacteria and archaea. Terrestrial microfossils include pollen and spores. Marine microfossils found in marine sediments are the most common microfossils. Everywhere in the oceans, microscopic protist organisms multiply prolifically, and many grow tiny skeletons which readily fossilise. These include foraminifera, dinoflagellates and radiolarians. Palaeontologists (geologists who study fossils) are interested in these microfossils because they can use them to determine how environments and climates have changed in the past, and where oil and gas can be found today.

Some microfossils are formed by colonial organisms such as Bryozoa (especially the Cheilostomata), which have relatively large colonies but are classified by fine skeletal details of the small individuals of the colony. As another example, many fossil genera of Foraminifera, which are protists are known from shells (called tests) that were as big as coins, such as the genus Nummulites.

In 2017, fossilized microorganisms, or microfossils, were discovered in hydrothermal vent precipitates in the Nuvvuagittuq Belt of Quebec, Canada that may be as old as 4.28 billion years old, the oldest record of life on Earth, suggesting "an almost instantaneous emergence of life" (in a geological time-scale), after ocean formation 4.41 billion years ago, and not long after the formation of the Earth 4.54 billion years ago. Nonetheless, life may have started even earlier, at nearly 4.5 billion years ago, as claimed by some researchers.

== Index fossils ==
Index fossils, also known as guide fossils, indicator fossils or dating fossils, are the fossilized remains or traces of particular plants or animals that are characteristic of a particular span of geologic time or environment, and can be used to identify and date the containing rocks. To be practical, index fossils must have a limited vertical time range, wide geographic distribution, and rapid evolutionary trends. Rock formations separated by great distances but containing the same index fossil species are thereby known to have both formed during the limited time that the species lived.

Index fossils were originally used to define and identify geologic units, then became a basis for defining geologic periods, and then for faunal stages and zones.

Species of microfossils such as acritarchs, chitinozoans, conodonts, dinoflagellate cysts, ostracods, pollen, spores and foraminiferans are amongst the many species have been identified as index fossils that are widely used in biostratigraphy. Different fossils work well for sediments of different ages. To work well, the fossils used must be widespread geographically, so that they can be found in many different places. They must also be short lived as a species, so that the period of time during which they could be incorporated in the sediment is relatively narrow. The longer lived the species, the poorer the stratigraphic precision, so fossils that evolve rapidly.

Often biostratigraphic correlations are based on a faunal assemblage, rather than an individual species — this allows greater precision as the time span in which all of the species in the assemblage existed together is narrower than the time spans of any of the members. Further, if only one species is present in a sample, it can mean either that (1) the strata were formed in the known fossil range of that organism; or (2) that the fossil range of the organism was incompletely known, and the strata extend the known fossil range. If the fossil is easy to preserve and easy to identify, more precise time estimating of the stratigraphic layers is possible.

== Composition ==
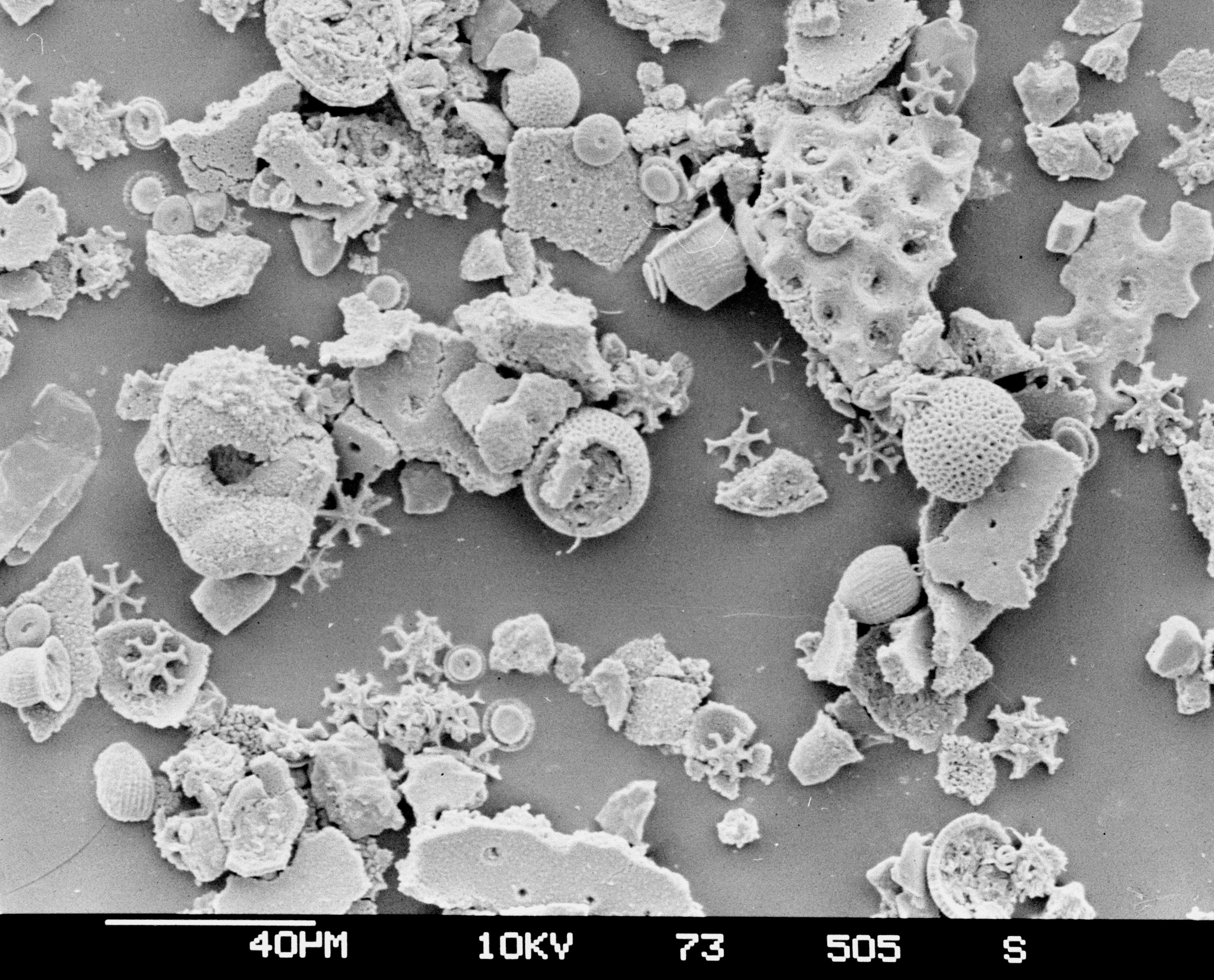
Microfossils from a deep sea sediment core

Microfossils can be classified by their composition as: (a) siliceous, as in diatoms and radiolaria, (b) calcareous, as in coccoliths and foraminifera, (c) phosphatic, as in the study of some vertebrates, or (d) organic, as in the pollen and spores studied in palynology. This division focuses on differences in the mineralogical and chemical composition of microfossil remains rather than on taxonomic or ecological distinctions.

- Siliceous microfossils: Siliceous microfossils include diatoms, radiolarians, silicoflagellates, ebridians, phytoliths, some scolecodonts (worm jaws), and sponge spicules.
- Calcareous microfossils: Calcareous (CaCO_{3}) microfossils include coccoliths, foraminifera, calcareous dinoflagellate cysts, and ostracods (seed shrimp).
- Phosphatic microfossils: Phosphatic microfossils include conodonts (tiny oral structures of an extinct chordate group), some scolecodonts (worm jaws), shark spines and teeth and other fish remains (collectively called ichthyoliths).
- Organic microfossils: The study of organic microfossils is called palynology. Organic microfossils include pollen, spores, chitinozoans (thought to be the egg cases of marine invertebrates), scolecodonts (worm jaws), acritarchs, dinoflagellate cysts, and fungal remains.

== Organic-walled ==
=== Pollen grain ===
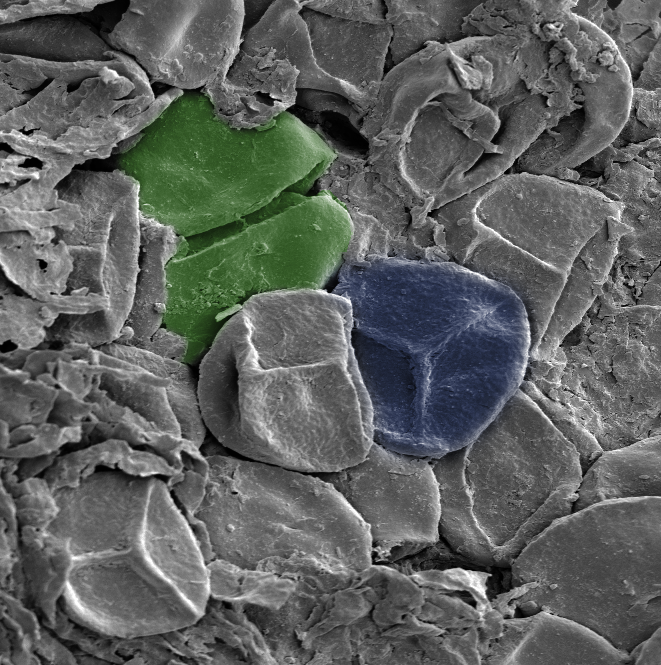
Late Silurian sporangium bearing trilete spores provide the earliest evidence of life on land. Green: spore tetrad. Blue: spore with Y-shaped trilete mark. Spores are about 30–35 μm across

Pollen has an outer sheath, called a sporopollenin, which affords it some resistance to the rigours of the fossilisation process that destroy weaker objects. It is produced in huge quantities. There is an extensive fossil record of pollen grains, often disassociated from their parent plant. The discipline of palynology is devoted to the study of pollen, which can be used both for biostratigraphy and to gain information about the abundance and variety of plants alive — which can itself yield important information about paleoclimates. Also, pollen analysis has been widely used for reconstructing past changes in vegetation and their associated drivers. Pollen is first found in the fossil record in the late Devonian period, but at that time it is indistinguishable from spores. It increases in abundance until the present day.

=== Plant spores ===
A spore is a unit of sexual or asexual reproduction that may be adapted for dispersal and for survival, often for extended periods of time, in unfavourable conditions. Spores form part of the life cycles of many plants, algae, fungi and protozoa. Bacterial spores are not part of a sexual cycle but are resistant structures used for survival under unfavourable conditions.

=== Chitinozoa ===
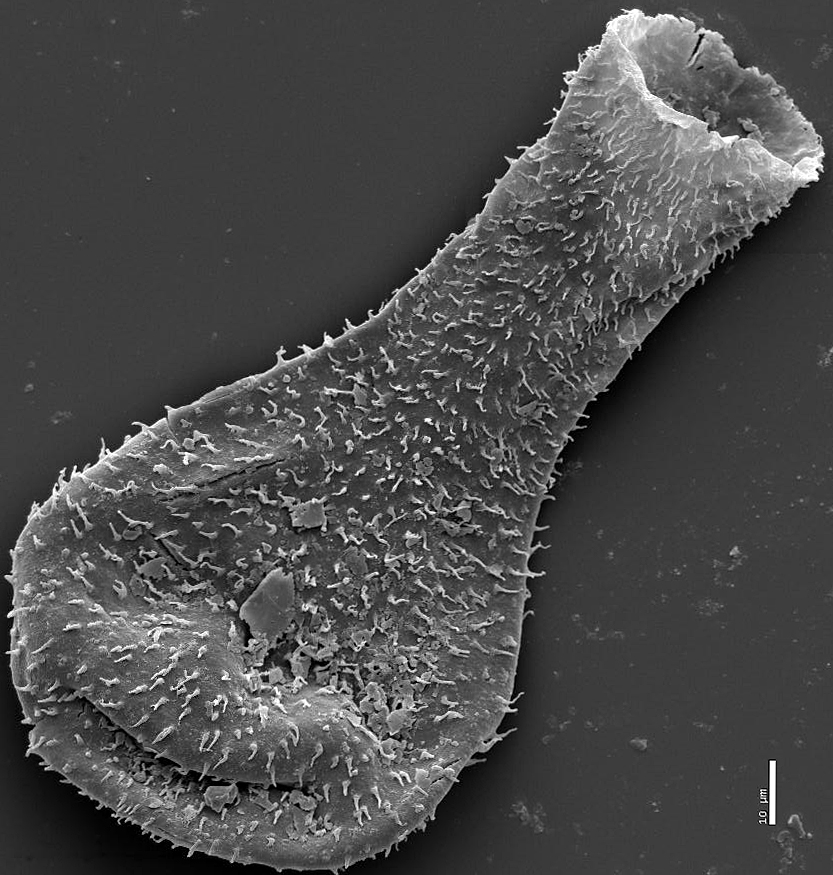
A Late Silurian chitinozoan from the Burgsvik beds showing its flask shape

Chitinozoa are a taxon of flask-shaped, organic walled marine microfossils produced by an as-yet-unknown organism.

Common from the Ordovician to Devonian periods (i.e. the mid-Paleozoic), the millimetre-scale organisms are abundant in almost all types of marine sediment across the globe. This wide distribution, and their rapid pace of evolution, makes them valuable biostratigraphic markers.

Their bizarre form has made classification and ecological reconstruction difficult. Since their discovery in 1931, suggestions of protist, plant, and fungal affinities have all been entertained. The organisms have been better understood as improvements in microscopy facilitated the study of their fine structure, and it has been suggested that they represent either the eggs or juvenile stage of a marine animal. However, recent research has suggested that they represent the test of a group of protists with uncertain affinities.

The ecology of chitinozoa is also open to speculation; some may have floated in the water column, where others may have attached themselves to other organisms. Most species were particular about their living conditions, and tend to be most common in specific paleoenvironments. Their abundance also varied with the seasons.

=== Acritarchs ===
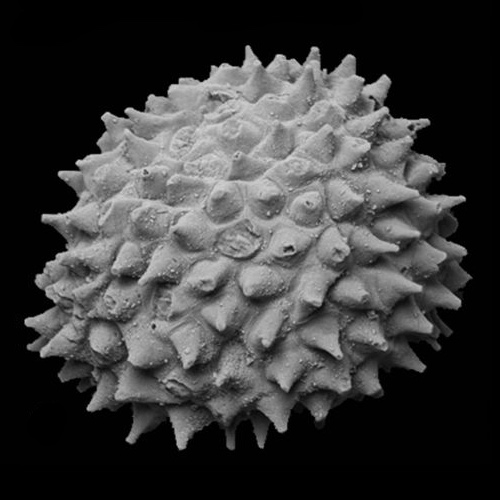
Acritarch from the Weng'an biota c. 570–609 mya

Acritarchs, Greek for confused origins, are organic-walled microfossils, known from about 2,000 million years ago to the present. Acritarchs are not a specific biological taxon, but rather a group with uncertain or unknown affinities. Most commonly they are composed of thermally altered acid insoluble carbon compounds (kerogen). While the classification of acritarchs into form genera is entirely artificial, it is not without merit, as the form taxa show traits similar to those of genuine taxa — for example the 'explosion' in the Cambrian and the mass extinction at the end of the Permian.

Acritarch diversity reflects major ecological events such as the appearance of predation and the Cambrian explosion. Precambrian marine diversity was dominated by acritarchs. They underwent a boom around 1,000 million years ago, increasing in abundance, diversity, size, complexity of shape, and especially size and number of spines. Their increasingly spiny forms in the last 1 billion years may indicate an increased need for defence against predation.

Acritarchs may include the remains of a wide range of quite different kinds of organisms—ranging from the egg cases of small metazoans to resting cysts of many kinds of chlorophyta (green algae). It is likely that most acritarch species from the Paleozoic represent various stages of the life cycle of algae that were ancestral to the dinoflagellates. The nature of the organisms associated with older acritarchs is generally not well understood, though many are probably related to unicellular marine algae. In theory, when the biological source (taxon) of an acritarch does become known, that particular microfossil is removed from the acritarchs and classified with its proper group.

Acritarchs were most likely eukaryotes. While archaea, bacteria and cyanobacteria (prokaryotes) usually produce simple fossils of a very small size, eukaryotic unicellular fossils are usually larger and more complex, with external morphological projections and ornamentation such as spines and hairs that only eukaryotes can produce; as most acritarchs have external projections (e.g., hair, spines, thick cell membranes, etc.), they are predominantly eukaryotes, although simple eukaryote acritarchs also exist.

Acritarchs are found in sedimentary rocks from the present back into the Archean. They are typically isolated from siliciclastic sedimentary rocks using hydrofluoric acid but are occasionally extracted from carbonate-rich rocks. They are excellent candidates for index fossils used for dating rock formations in the Paleozoic Era and when other fossils are not available. Because most acritarchs are thought to be marine (pre-Triassic), they are also useful for palaeoenvironmental interpretation. The Archean and earliest Proterozoic microfossils termed "acritarchs" may actually be prokaryotes. The earliest eukaryotic acritarchs known (as of 2020) are from between 1950 and 2150 million years ago.

Recent application of atomic force microscopy, confocal microscopy, Raman spectroscopy, and other analytic techniques to the study of the ultrastructure, life history, and systematic affinities of mineralized, but originally organic-walled microfossils, have shown some acritarchs are fossilized microalgae. In the end, it may well be, as Moczydłowska et al. suggested in 2011, that many acritarchs will, in fact, turn out to be algae.

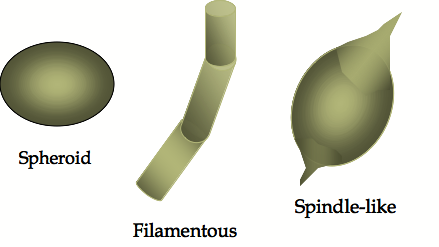
Three main types of Archean cell morphologies

=== Archean cells ===
Cells can be preserved in the rock record because their cell walls are made of proteins which convert to the organic material kerogen as the cell breaks down after death. Kerogen is insoluble in mineral acids, bases, and organic solvents. Over time, it is mineralised into graphite or graphite-like carbon, or degrades into oil and gas hydrocarbons. There are three main types of cell morphologies. Though there is no established range of sizes for each type, spheroid microfossils can be as small as about 8 micrometres, filamentous microfossils have diameters typically less than 5 micrometres and have a length that can range from tens of micrometres to 100 micrometres, and spindle-like microfossils can be as long as 50 micrometres.

== Mineralised ==
=== Siliceous ===
Siliceous ooze is a type of biogenic pelagic sediment located on the deep ocean floor. Siliceous oozes are the least common of the deep sea sediments, and make up approximately 15% of the ocean floor. Oozes are defined as sediments which contain at least 30% skeletal remains of pelagic microorganisms. Siliceous oozes are largely composed of the silica based skeletons of microscopic marine organisms such as diatoms and radiolarians. Other components of siliceous oozes near continental margins may include terrestrially derived silica particles and sponge spicules. Siliceous oozes are composed of skeletons made from opal silica Si(O_{2}), as opposed to calcareous oozes, which are made from skeletons of calcium carbonate organisms (i.e. coccolithophores). Silica (Si) is a bioessential element and is efficiently recycled in the marine environment through the silica cycle. Distance from land masses, water depth and ocean fertility are all factors that affect the opal silica content in seawater and the presence of siliceous oozes.

Siliceous ooze
mineral forms	protist involved	name of skeleton	typical size	
SiO_{2} silica quartz glass opal chert	diatom	frustule	0.002 to 0.2 mm	diatom microfossil from 40 million years ago
SiO_{2} silica quartz glass opal chert	radiolarian	test or shell	0.1 to 0.2 mm	elaborate silica shell of a radiolarian

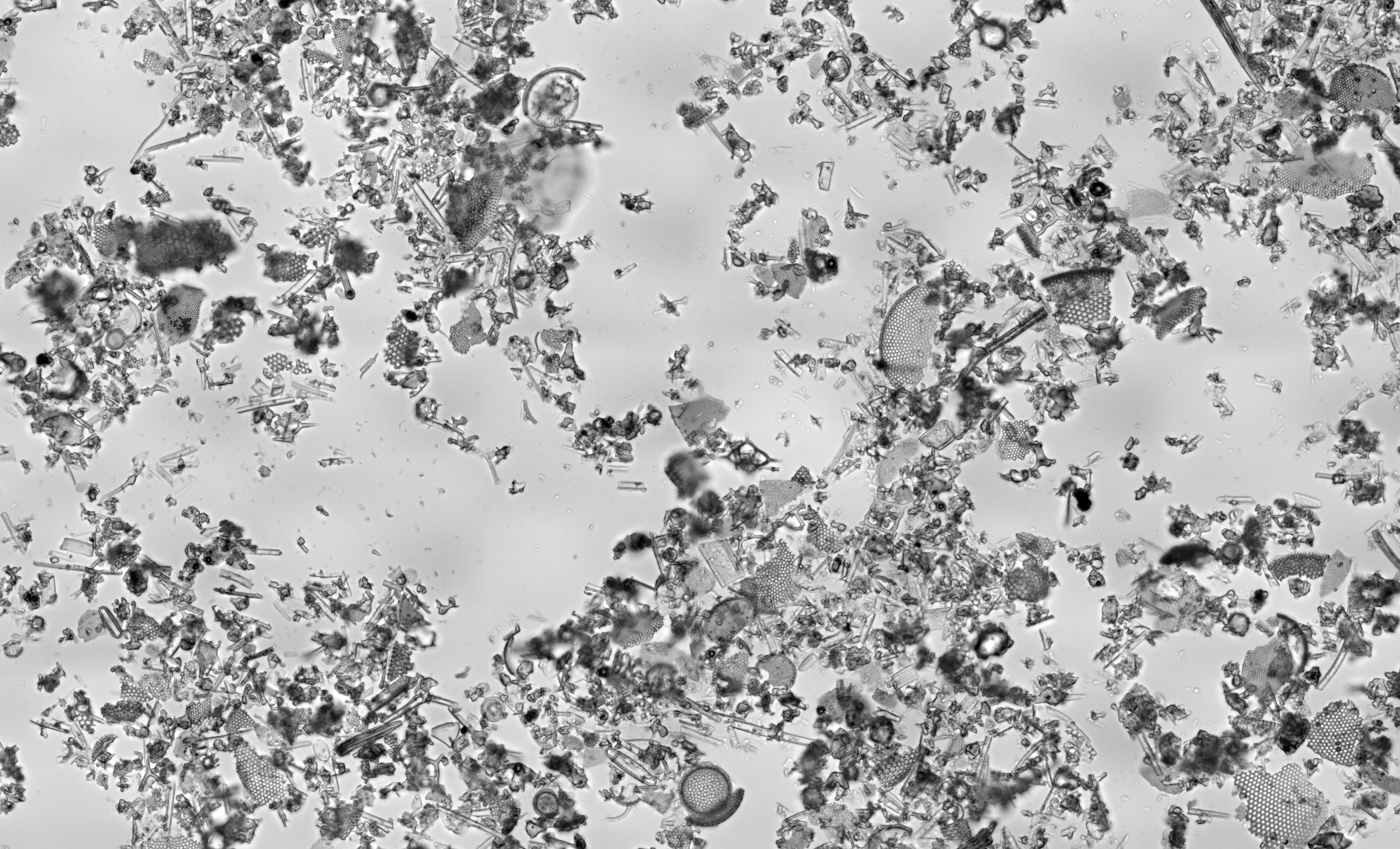
Diatomaceous earth is a soft, siliceous, sedimentary rock made up of microfossils in the form of the frustules (shells) of centric and pennate diatoms (click to magnify)

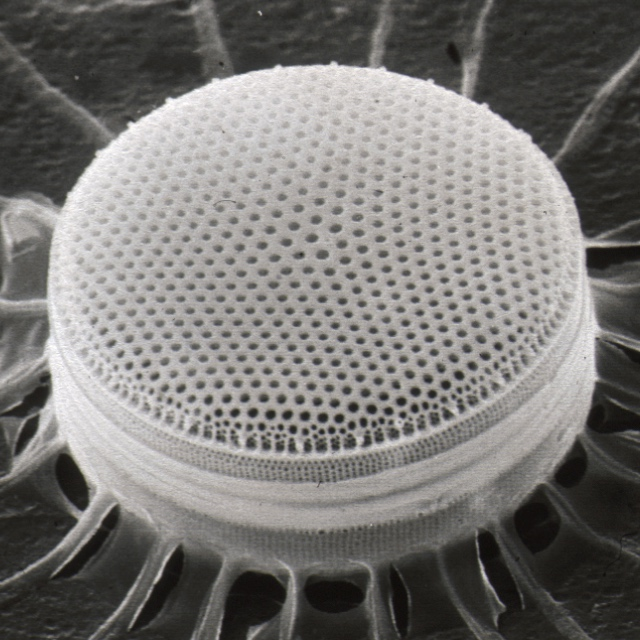
Centric diatom
(radial symmetry)

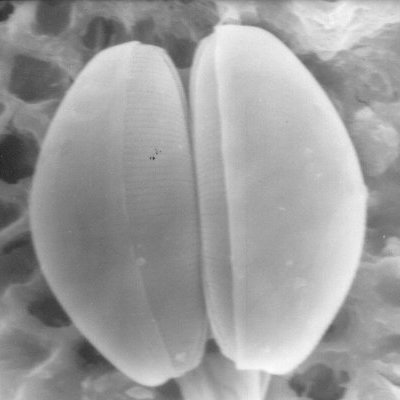
Pennate diatom
(bilateral symmetry)

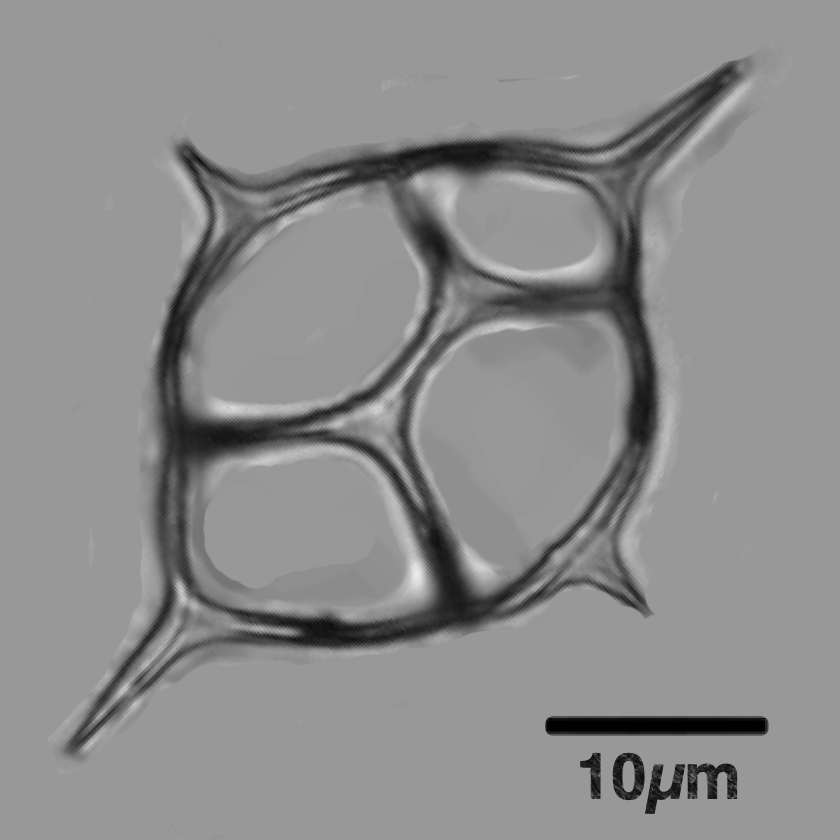
Silicoflagellate

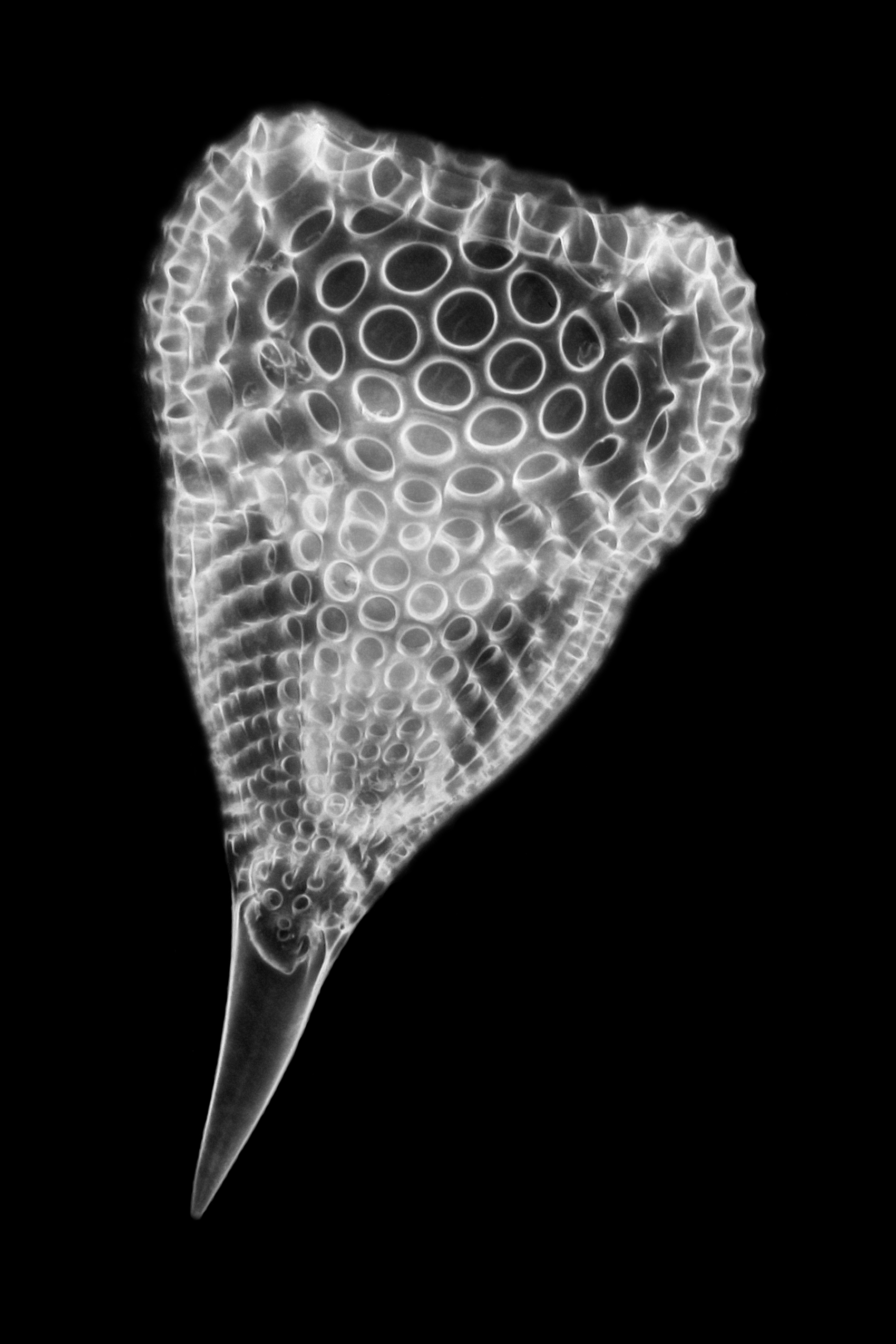
Radiolarian

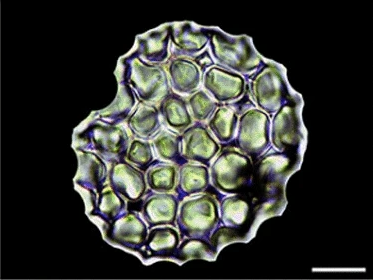
Phytolith from a leaf of the tree Cornus controversa • scale bar 20 μm

Phytoliths (Greek for plant stones) are rigid, microscopic structures made of silica, found in some plant tissues and persisting after the decay of the plant. These plants take up silica from the soil, whereupon it is deposited within different intracellular and extracellular structures of the plant. Phytoliths come in varying shapes and sizes. The term "phytolith" is sometimes used to refer to all mineral secretions by plants, but more commonly refers to siliceous plant remains.

=== Calcareous ===
The term calcareous can be applied to a fossil, sediment, or sedimentary rock which is formed from, or contains a high proportion of, calcium carbonate in the form of calcite or aragonite. Calcareous sediments (limestone) are usually deposited in shallow water near land, since the carbonate is precipitated by marine organisms that need land-derived nutrients. Generally speaking, the farther from land sediments fall, the less calcareous they are. Some areas can have interbedded calcareous sediments due to storms, or changes in ocean currents. Calcareous ooze is a form of calcium carbonate derived from planktonic organisms that accumulates on the sea floor. This can only occur if the ocean is shallower than the carbonate compensation depth. Below this depth, calcium carbonate begins to dissolve in the ocean, and only non-calcareous sediments are stable, such as siliceous ooze or pelagic red clay.

Calcareous ooze
mineral forms	protist involved	name of skeleton	typical size	
CaCO_{3} calcite aragonite limestone marble chalk	foraminiferan	test or shell	many under 1 mm	Calcified test of a planktic foraminiferan. There are about 10,000 living species of foraminiferans
CaCO_{3} calcite aragonite limestone marble chalk	coccolithophore	coccoliths	under 0.1 mm	Coccolithophores are the largest global source of biogenic calcium carbonate, and significantly contribute to the global carbon cycle. They are the main constituent of chalk deposits such as the white cliffs of Dover.

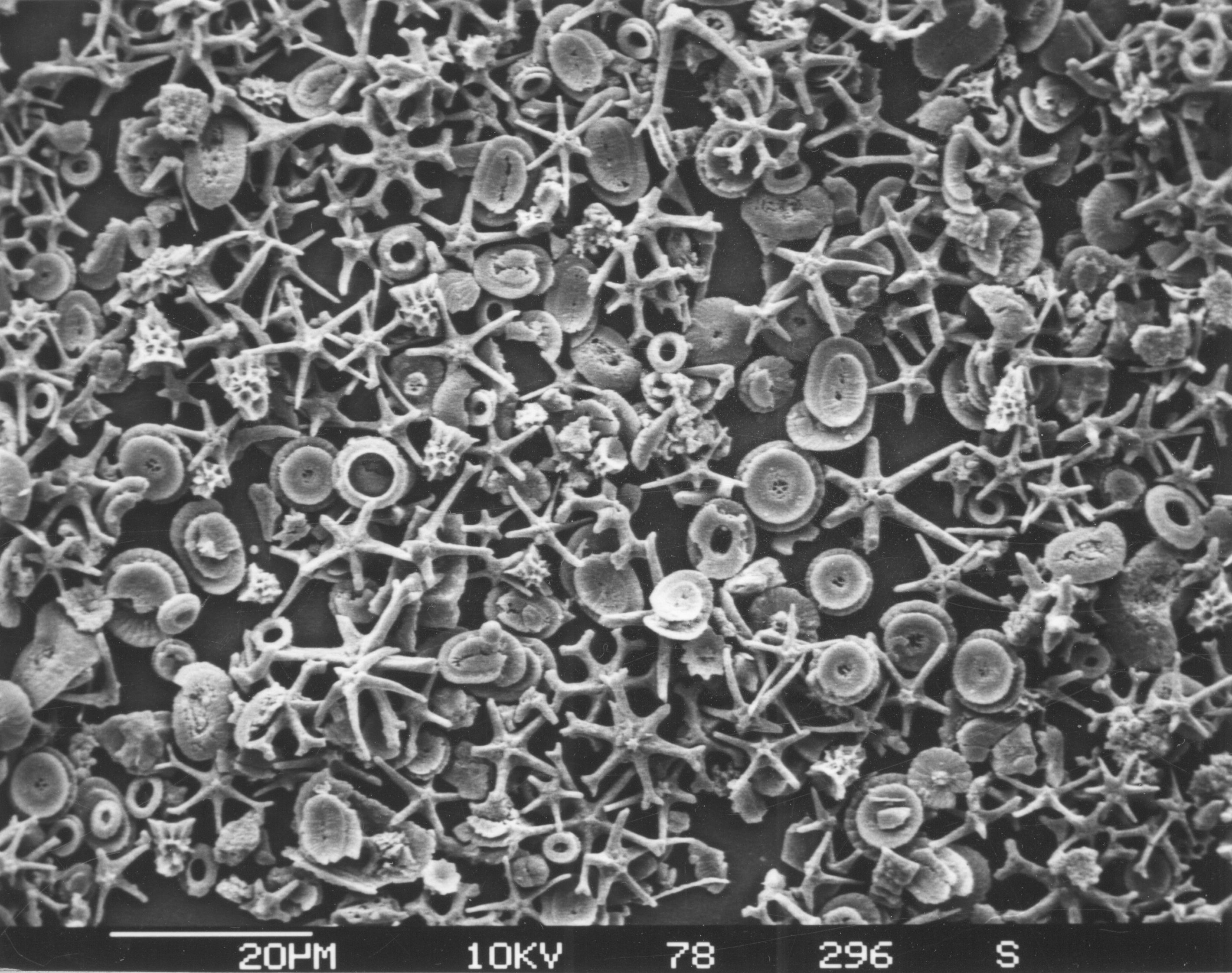
Calcareous microfossils from marine sediment consisting mainly of star-shaped discoaster with a sprinkling of coccoliths

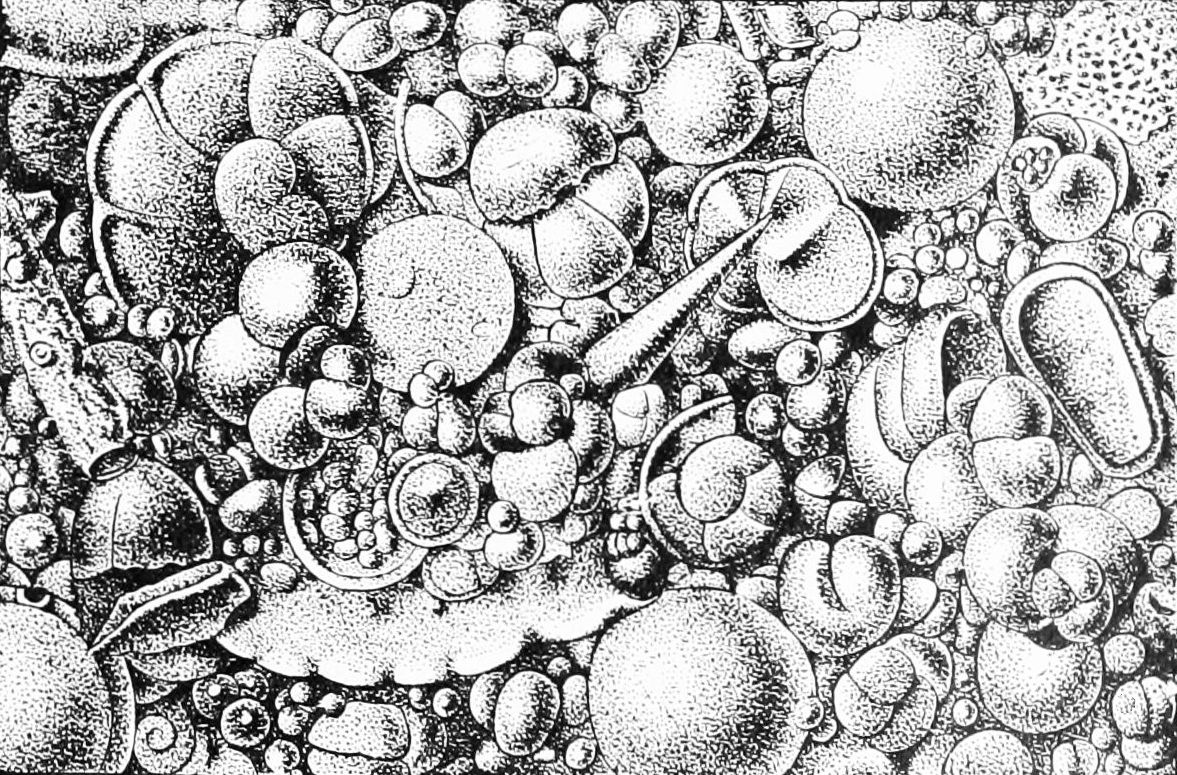
Illustration of a Globigerina ooze

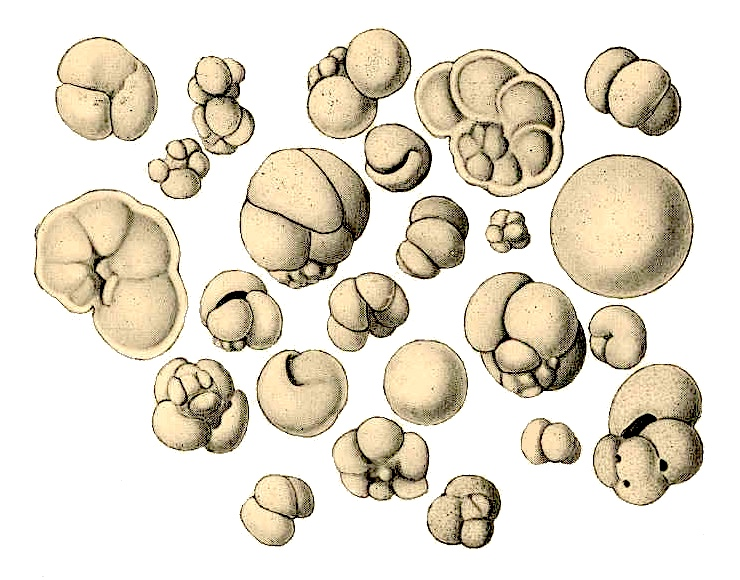
Shells (tests), usually made of calcium carbonate, from a foraminiferal ooze on the deep ocean floor

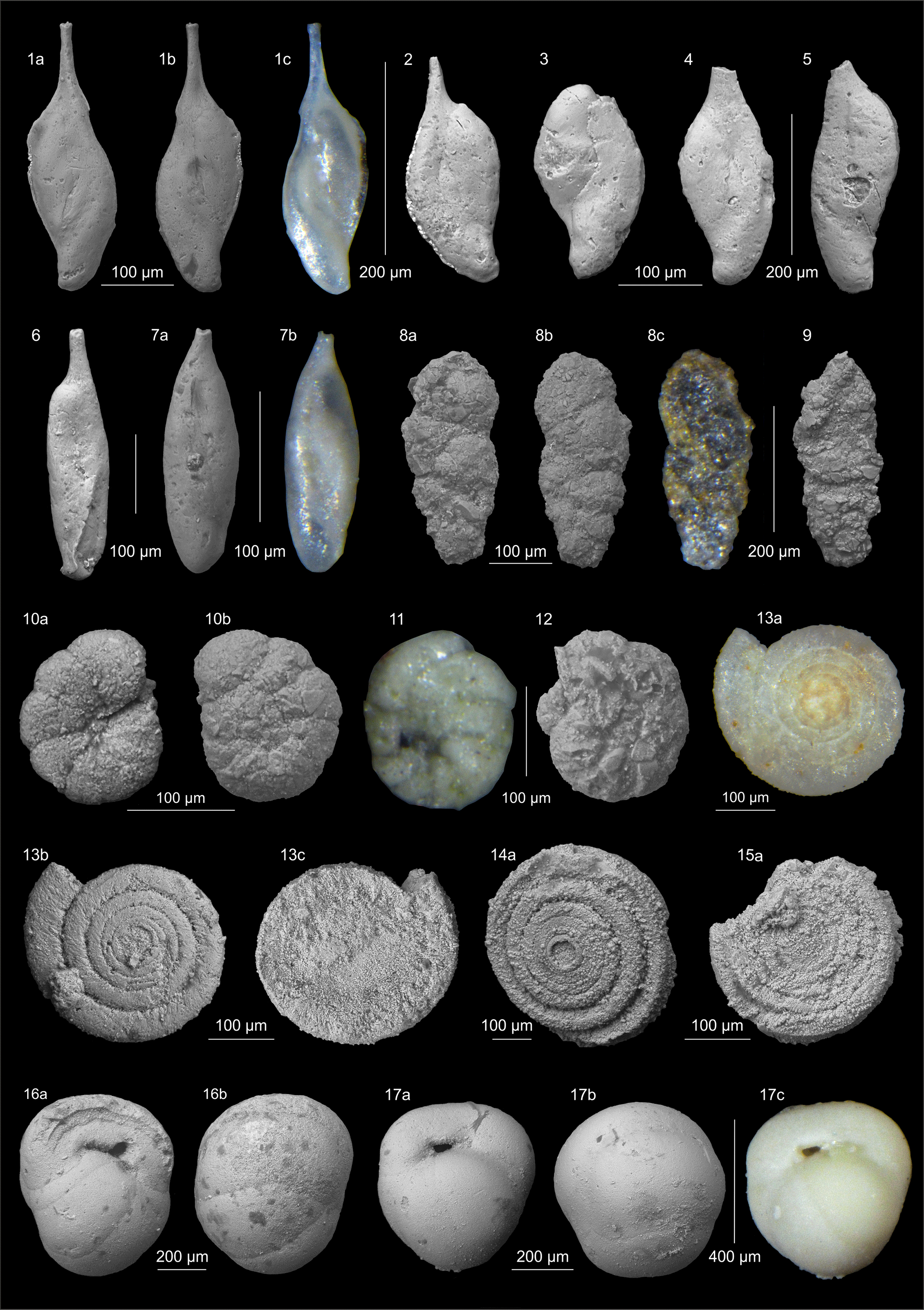
Mesozoic benthic foraminifera

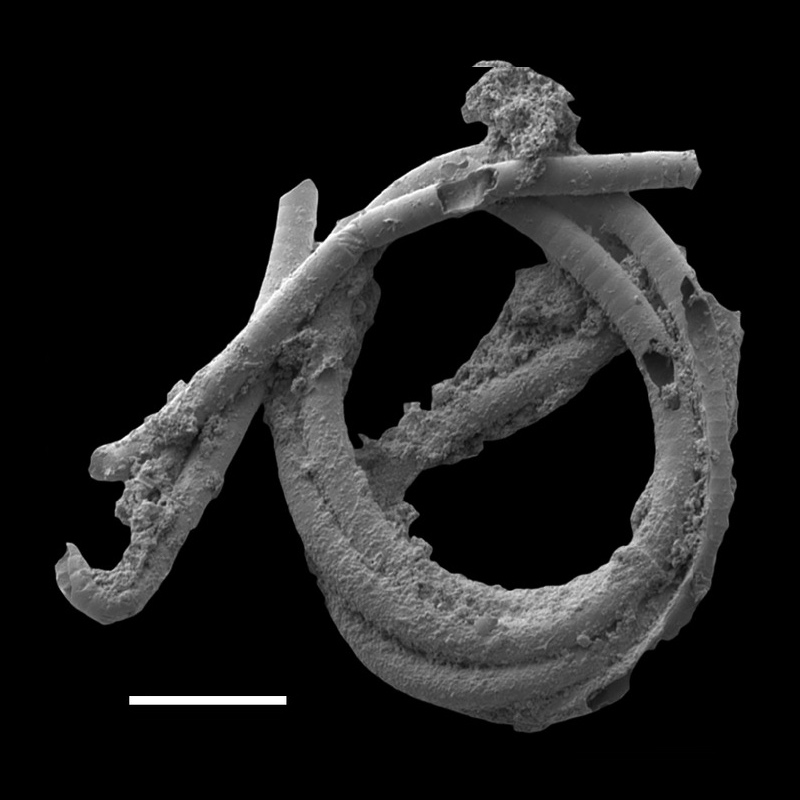
Cyanobacterial remains of an annulated tubular microfossil Oscillatoriopsis longa Scale bar: 100 μm

== Ostracods ==
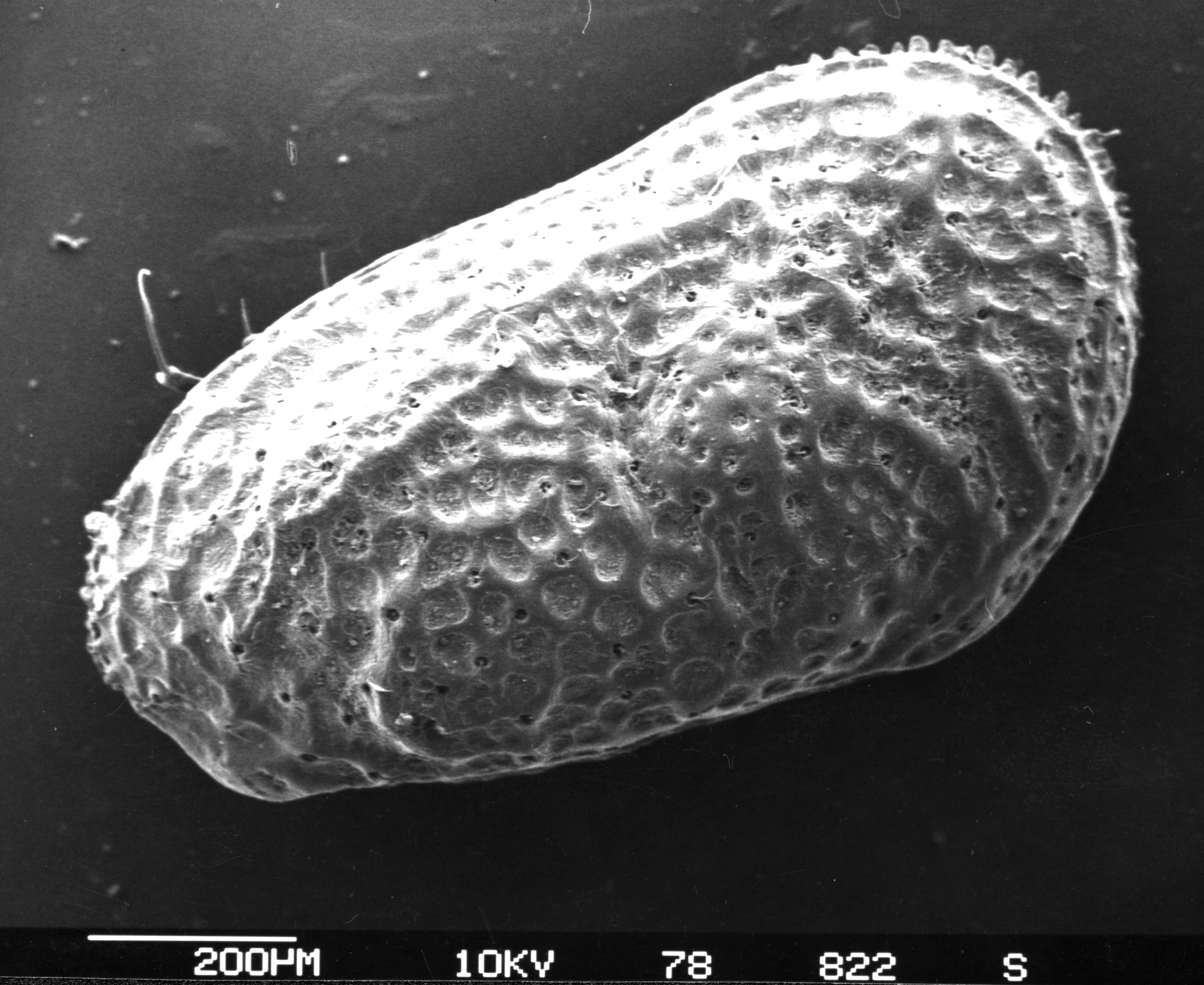
Ostracod microfossil

Ostracods are widespread crustaceans, generally small, sometimes known as seed shrimps. They are flattened from side to side and protected with a calcareous or chitinous bivalve-like shell. There are about 70,000 known species, 13,000 of which are extant. Ostracods are typically about 1 mm (0.039 in) in size, though they can range from 0.2 to 30 mm (0.008 to 1.181 in), with some species such as Gigantocypris being too large to be regarded as microfossils.

== Conodonts ==
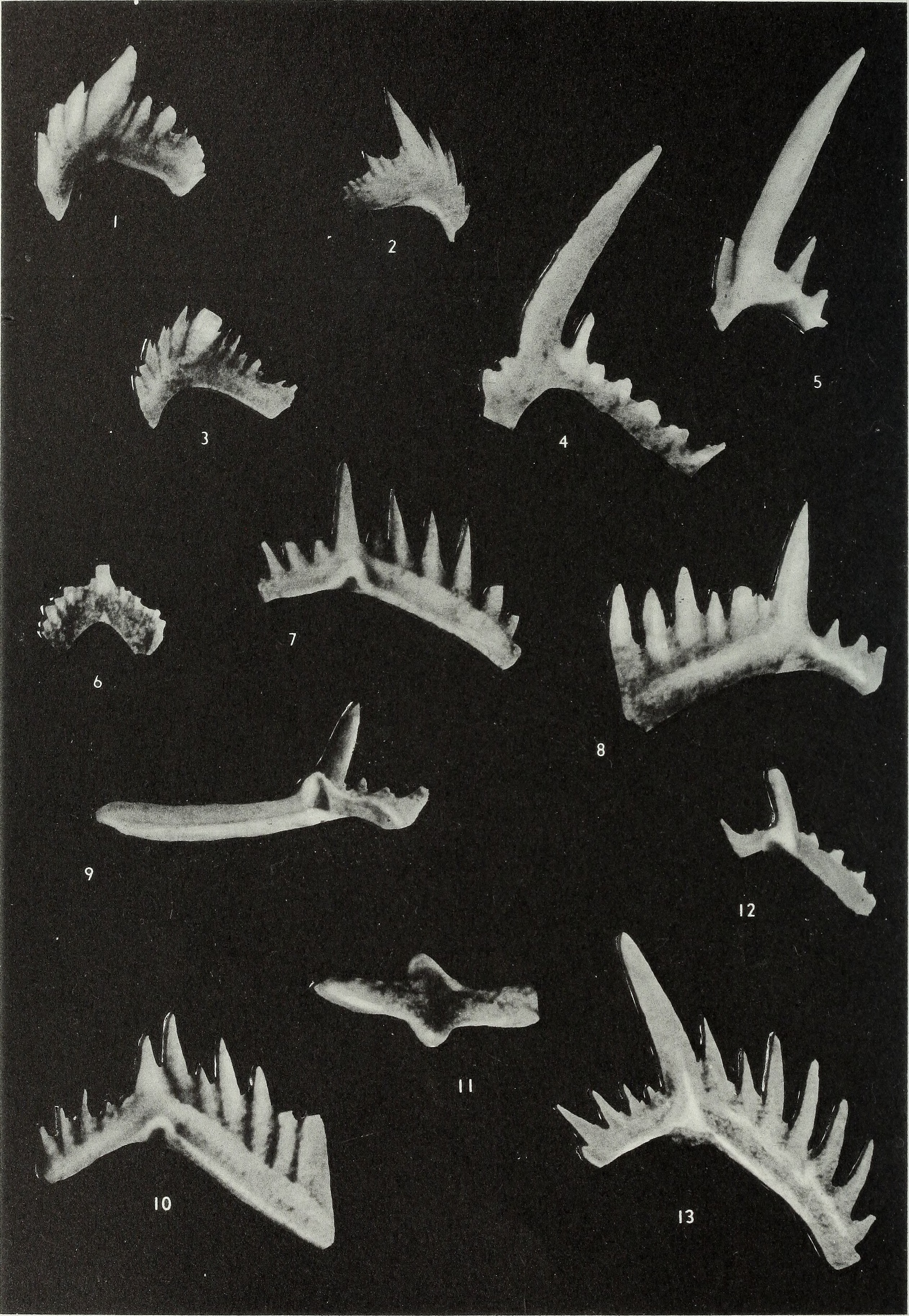
Conodont element found from the Cambrian to the end of the Triassic

Conodonts (cone tooth in Greek) are tiny, extinct jawless fish that resemble eels. For many years, they were known only from tooth-like microfossils found in isolation and now called conodont elements. The evolution of mineralized tissues has been a puzzle for more than a century. It has been hypothesized that the first mechanism of chordate tissue mineralization began either in the oral skeleton of conodont or the dermal skeleton of early agnathans. Conodont elements are made of a phosphatic mineral, hydroxylapatite.

The element array constituted a feeding apparatus that is radically different from the jaws of modern animals. They are now termed "conodont elements" to avoid confusion. The three forms of teeth (i.e., coniform cones, ramiform bars, and pectiniform platforms) probably performed different functions. For many years, conodonts were known only from enigmatic tooth-like microfossils (200 micrometres to 5 millimetres in length) which occur commonly, but not always in isolation, and were not associated with any other fossil.

Conodonts are globally widespread in sediments.Their many forms are considered index fossils, fossils used to define and identify geological periods and date strata. Conodonts elements can be used to estimate the temperatures rocks have been exposed to, which allows the thermal maturation levels of sedimentary rocks to be determined, which is important for hydrocarbon exploration. Conodont teeth are the earliest vertebrate teeth found in the fossil record, and some conodont teeth are the sharpest that have ever been recorded.

== Scolecodonts ==
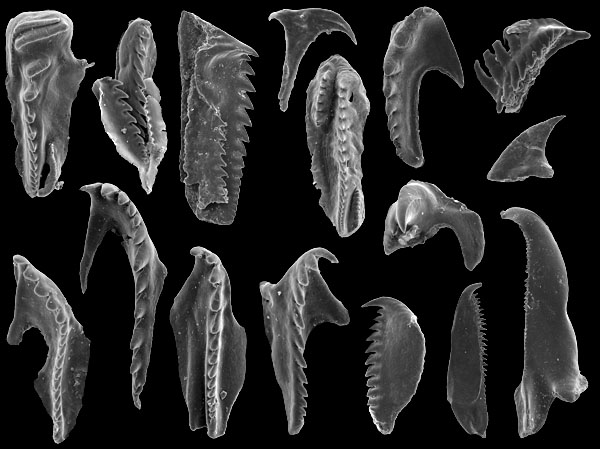
Scolecodonts from the Ordovician and Silurian

Scolecodonts (worm jaws in Latin) are tiny jaws of polychaete annelids of the order Eunicida - a diverse and abundant group of worms which has been inhabiting different marine environments in the past 500 million years. Composed of highly resistant organic substance, the scolecodonts are frequently found as fossils from the rocks as old as the late Cambrian. Since the worms themselves were soft-bodied and hence extremely rarely preserved in the fossil record, their jaws constitute the main evidence of polychaetes in the geological past, and the only way to restore the evolution of this important group of animals. Small size of scolecodonts, usually less than 1 mm, puts them into a microfossil category. They are common by-product of conodont, chitinozoan and acritarch samples, but sometimes they occur in the sediments where other fossils are very rare or absent.

== Cloudinids ==
The cloudinids were an early metazoan family that lived in the late Ediacaran period about 550 million years ago, and became extinct at the base of the Cambrian. They formed small millimetre size conical fossils consisting of calcareous cones nested within one another; the appearance of the organism itself remains unknown. The name Cloudina honors Preston Cloud. Fossils consist of a series of stacked vase-like calcite tubes, whose original mineral composition is unknown, Cloudinids comprise two genera: Cloudina itself is mineralized, whereas Conotubus is at best weakly mineralized, whilst sharing the same "funnel-in-funnel" construction.

Cloudinids had a wide geographic range, reflected in the present distribution of localities in which their fossils are found, and are an abundant component of some deposits. Cloudina is usually found in association with microbial stromatolites, which are limited to shallow water, and it has been suggested that cloudinids lived embedded in the microbial mats, growing new cones to avoid being buried by silt. However no specimens have been found embedded in mats, and their mode of life is still an unresolved question.

The classification of the cloudinids has proved difficult: they were initially regarded as polychaete worms, and then as coral-like cnidarians on the basis of what look like buds on some specimens. Current scientific opinion is divided between classifying them as polychaetes and regarding it as unsafe to classify them as members of any broader grouping. In 2020, a new study showed the presence of Nephrozoan type guts, the oldest on record, supporting the bilaterian interpretation.

Cloudinids are important in the history of animal evolution for two reasons. They are among the earliest and most abundant of the small shelly fossils with mineralized skeletons, and therefore feature in the debate about why such skeletons first appeared in the Late Ediacaran. The most widely supported answer is that their shells are a defense against predators, as some Cloudina specimens from China bear the marks of multiple attacks, which suggests they survived at least a few of them. The holes made by predators are approximately proportional to the size of the Cloudina specimens, and Sinotubulites fossils, which are often found in the same beds, have so far shown no such holes. These two points suggest that predators attacked in a selective manner, and the evolutionary arms race which this indicates is commonly cited as a cause of the Cambrian explosion of animal diversity and complexity.

== Dinoflagellate cysts ==
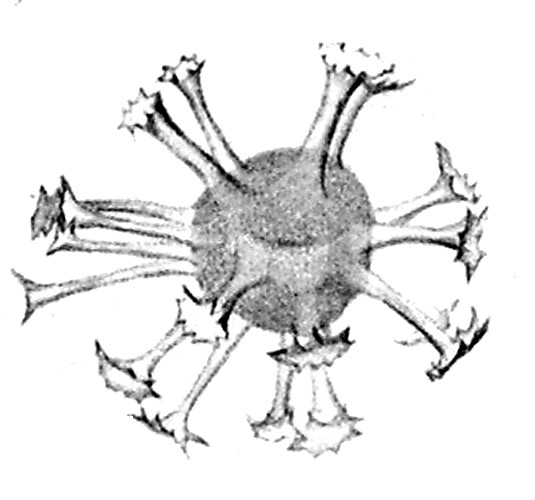
Dinocyst as drawn by Ehrenberg in 1837

Some dinoflagellates produce resting stages, called dinoflagellate cysts or dinocysts, as part of their lifecycles. Dinoflagellates are mainly represented in the fossil record by these dinocysts, typically 15 to 100 micrometres in diameter, which accumulate in sediments as microfossils. Organic-walled dinocysts have resistant cell walls made out of dinosporin. There are also calcareous dinoflagellate cysts and siliceous dinoflagellate cysts.

Dinocysts are produced by a proportion of dinoflagellates as a dormant, zygotic stage of their lifecycle. These dinocyst stages are known to occur in 84 of the 350 described freshwater dinoflagellate species, and in about 10% of the known marine species. Dinocysts have a long geological record with geochemical markers suggest a presence that goes back to the Early Cambrian.

== Sponge spicules ==
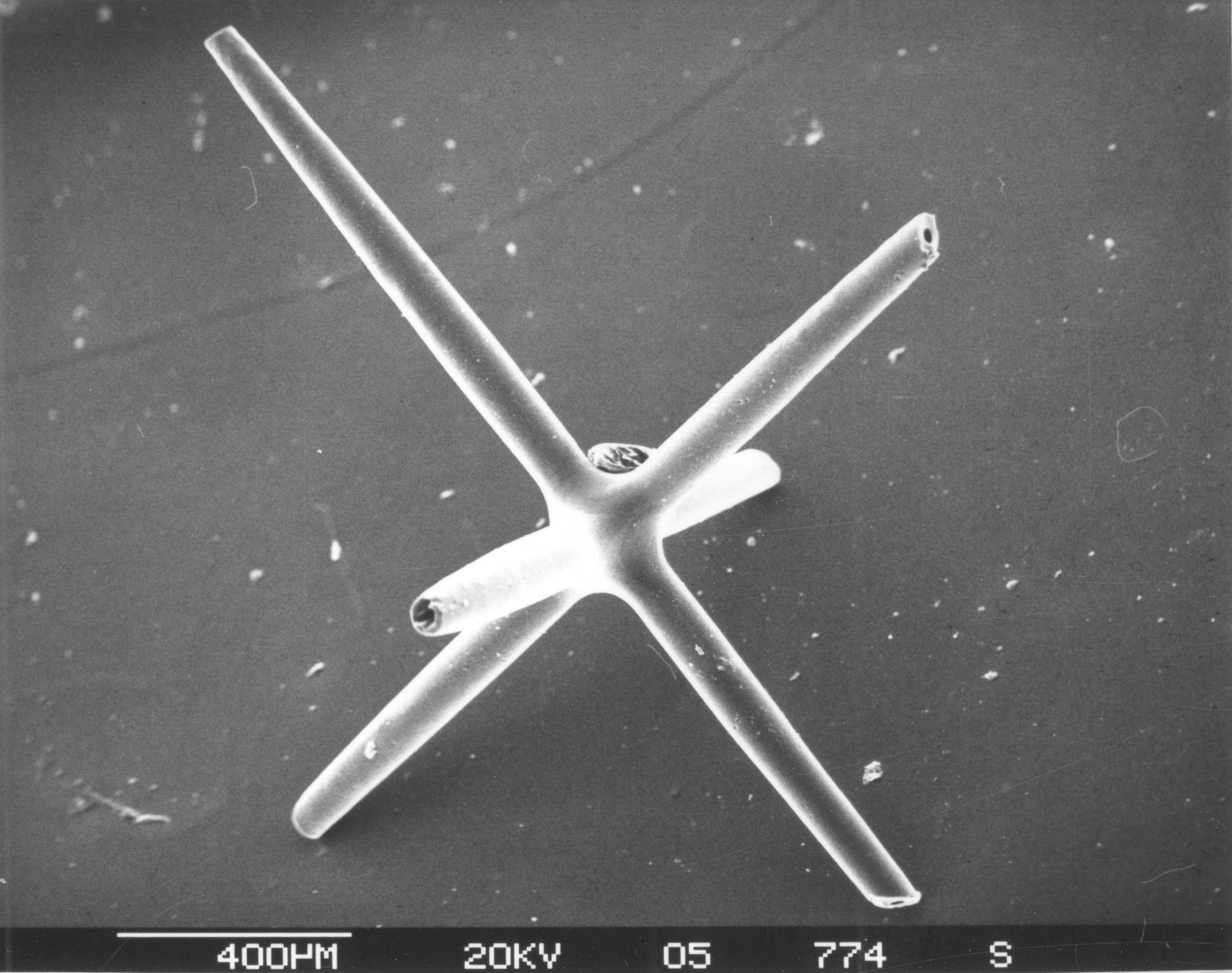
Six-pointed spicule from a siliceous glass sponge

Spicules are structural elements found in most sponges. They provide structural support and deter predators. The meshing of many spicules serves as the sponge's skeleton, providing structural support and defense against predators.

Smaller, microscopic spicules can become microfossils, and are referred to as microscleres. Larger spicules visible to the naked eye are called megascleres. Spicule can be calcareous, siliceous, or composed of spongin. They are found in a range of symmetry types.

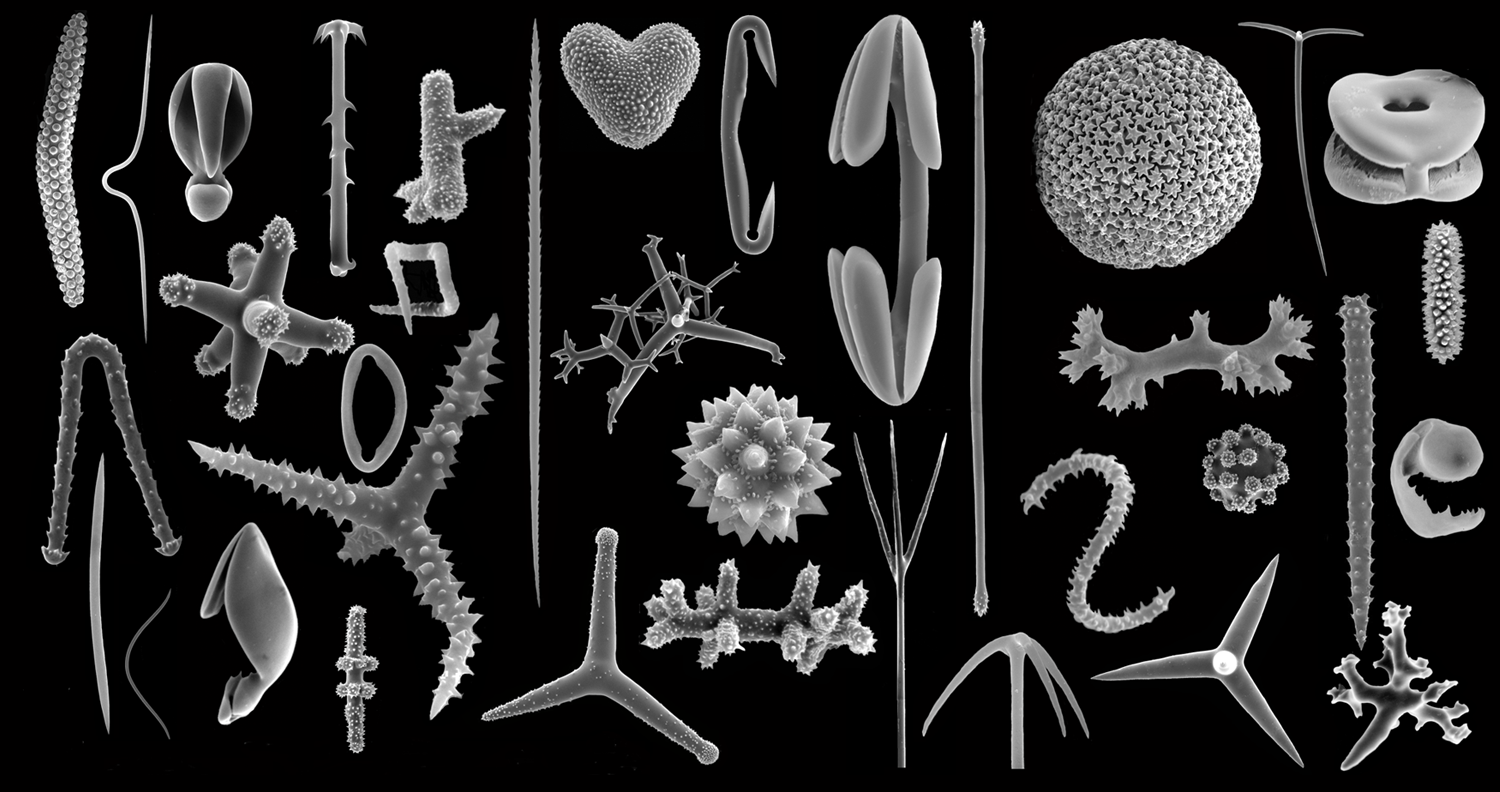
Scanning electron microscope images of various microscleres and megascleres of demosponges

== Marine sediments ==
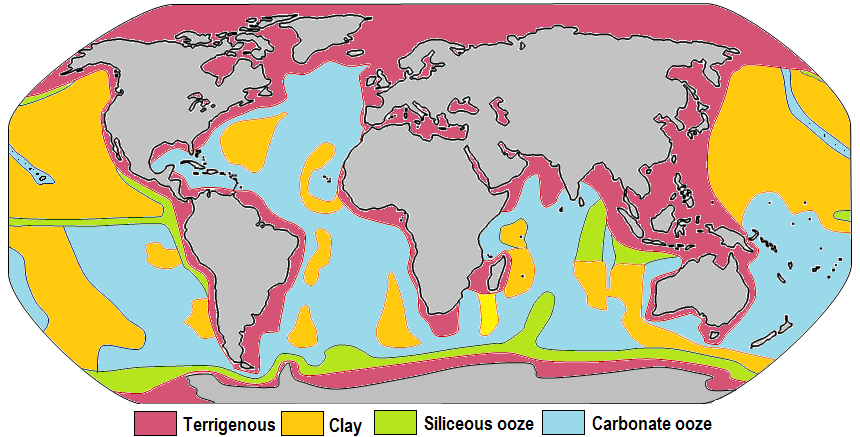
Distribution of sediment types on the seafloor Within each colored area, the type of material shown is what dominates, although other materials are also likely to be present. For further information, see here

Carbonate-silicate cycle

Sediments at the bottom of the ocean have two main origins, terrigenous and biogenous.

Terrigenous sediments account for about 45% of the total marine sediment, and originate in the erosion of rocks on land, transported by rivers and land runoff, windborne dust, volcanoes, or grinding by glaciers.

=== Biogenous ===
Biogenous sediments account for the other 55% of the total sediment, and originate in the skeletal remains of marine protists (single-celled plankton and benthos microorganisms). Much smaller amounts of precipitated minerals and meteoric dust can also be present. Ooze, in the context of a marine sediment, does not refer to the consistency of the sediment but to its biological origin. The term ooze was originally used by John Murray, the "father of modern oceanography", who proposed the term radiolarian ooze for the silica deposits of radiolarian shells brought to the surface during the Challenger expedition. A biogenic ooze is a pelagic sediment containing at least 30 per cent from the skeletal remains of marine organisms.

- Diatomaceous earth
- Siliceous ooze
- Kerogen
  - Alginite

=== Lithified ===
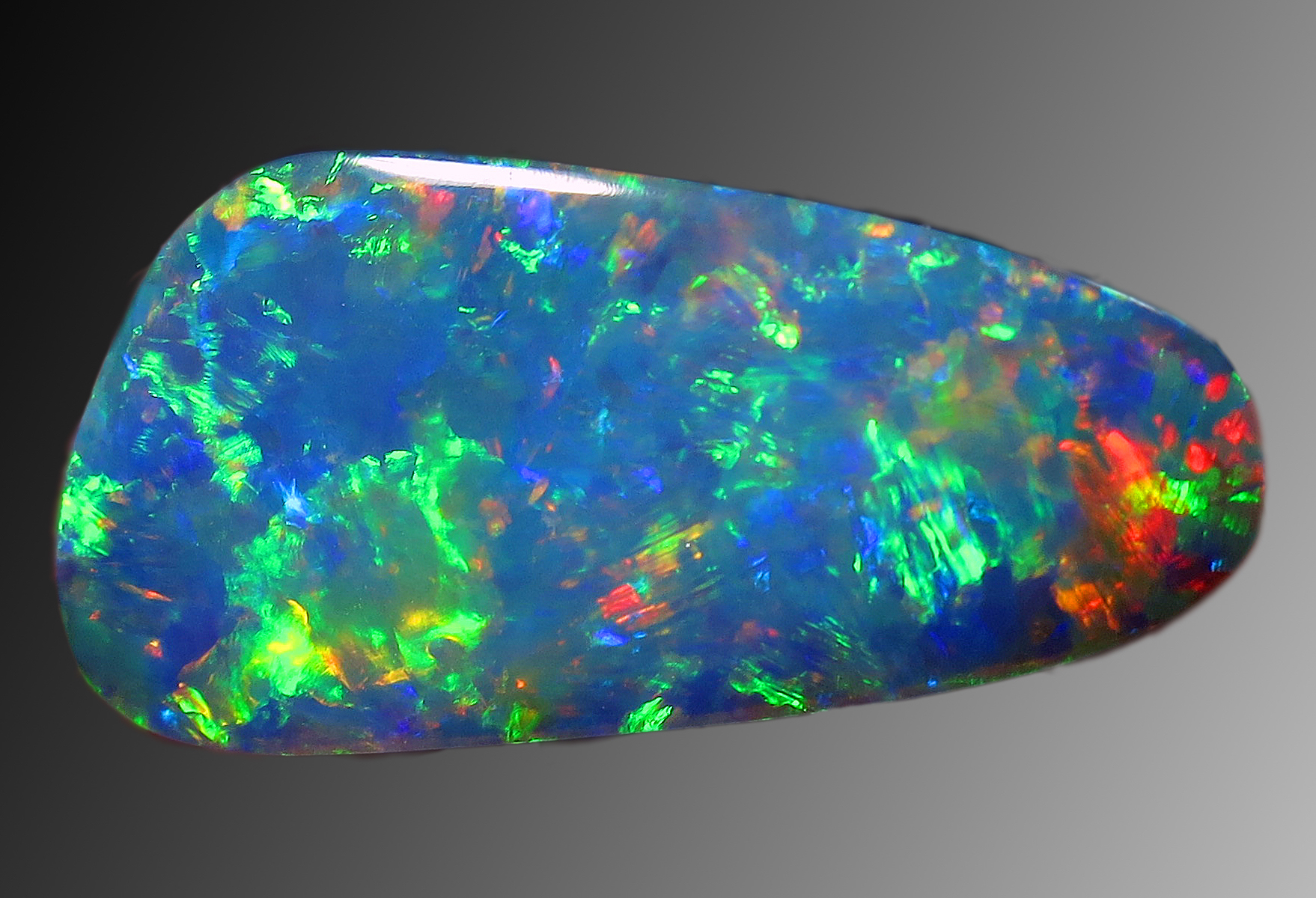
Opal can include microfossil diatoms, radiolarians, silicoflagellates and ebridians

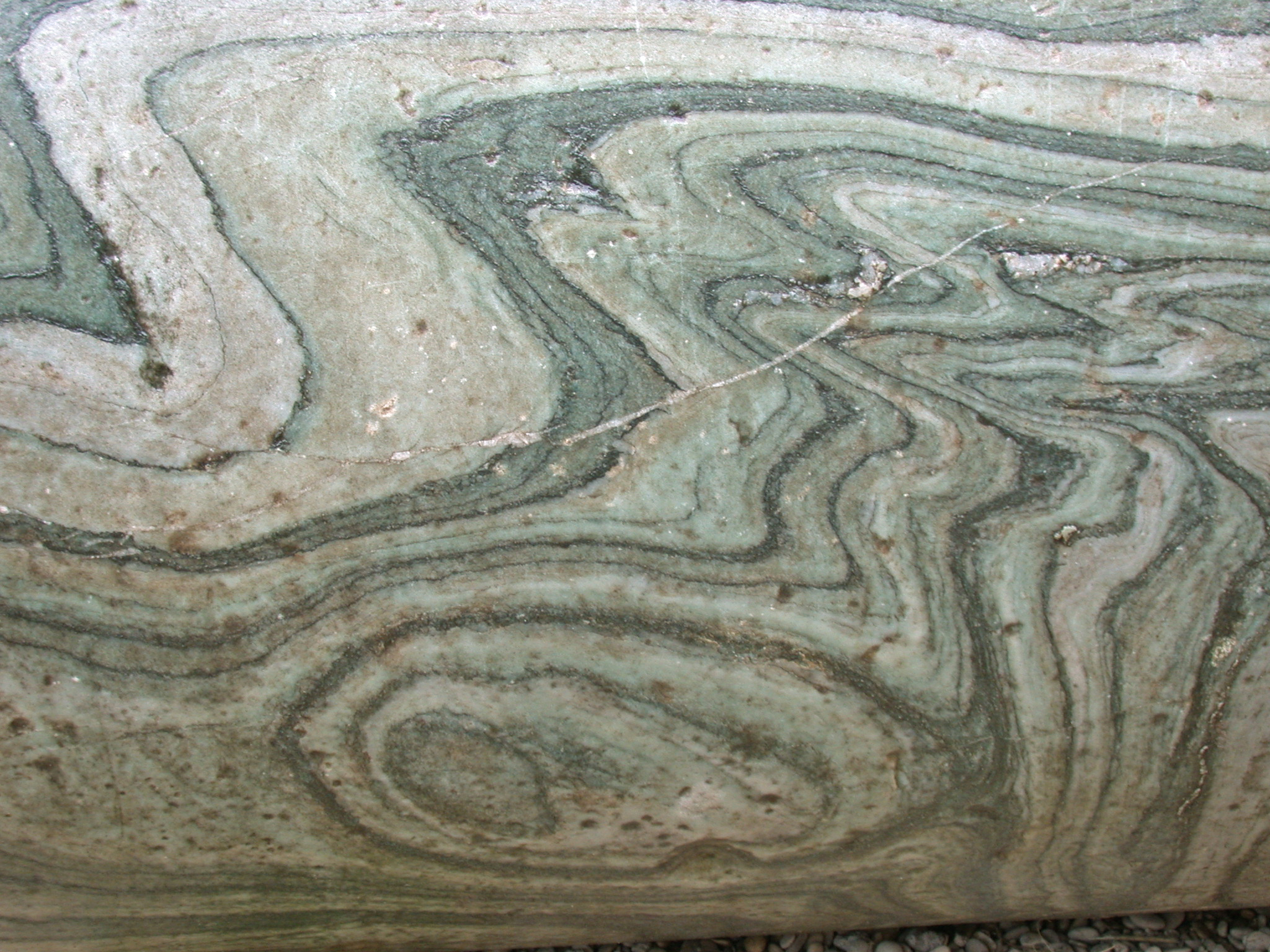
Marble can contain microfossil foraminiferans, coccolithophores, calcareous nannoplankton and algae, ostracodes, pteropods, calpionellids and bryozoa

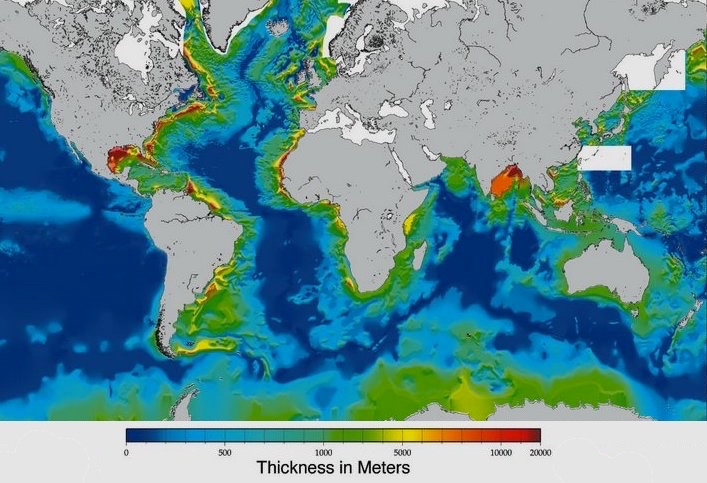
Thickness of marine sediments

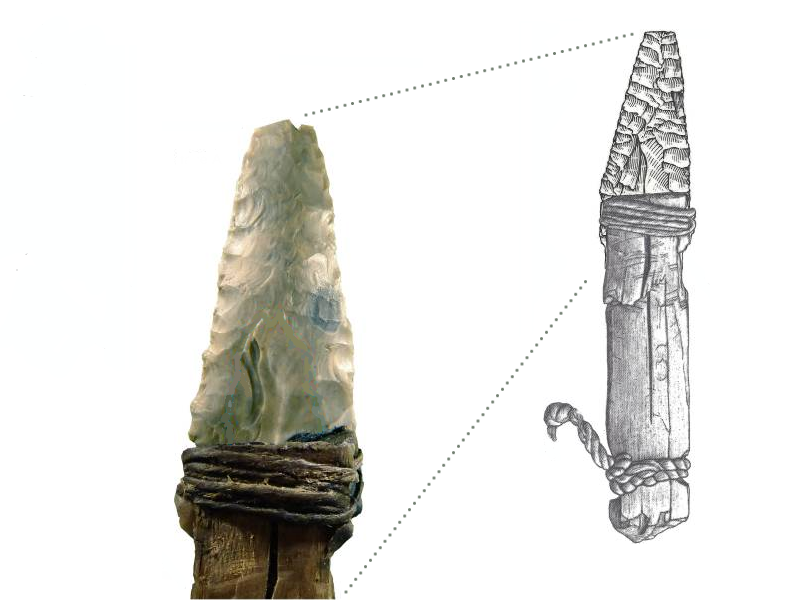
Stone dagger of Ötzi the Iceman who lived during the Copper Age. The blade is made of chert containing radiolarians, calcispheres, calpionellids and a few sponge spicules. The presence of calpionellids, which are extinct, was used to date this dagger.

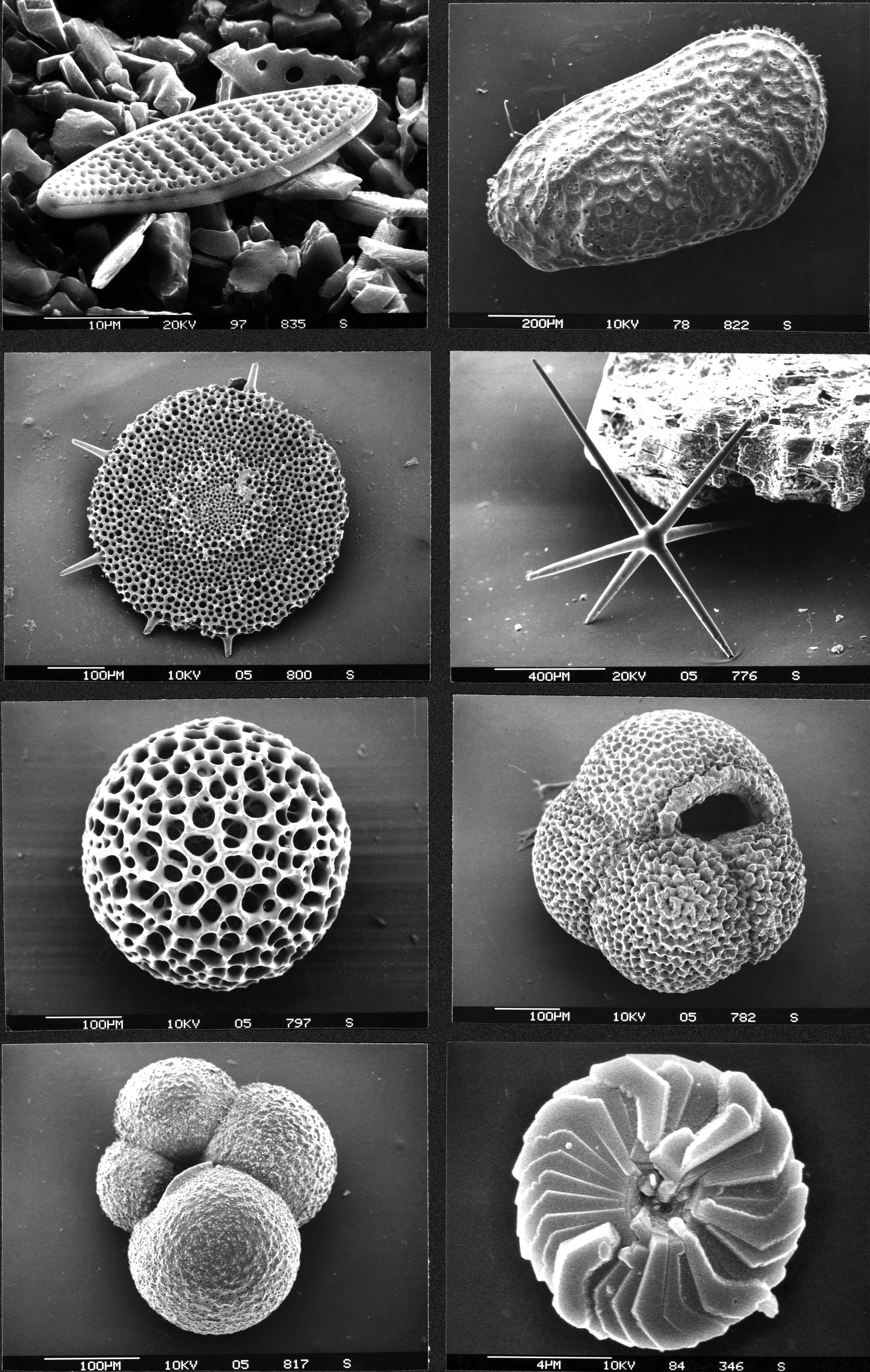
Some marine microfossils

== Micropaleontology ==
The study of microfossils is called micropaleontology. In micropaleontology, what would otherwise be distinct categories are grouped together based solely on their size, including microscopic organisms and minute parts of larger organisms. Numerous sediments have microfossils, which serve as significant biostratigraphic, paleoenvironmental, and paleoceanographic markers. Their widespread presence around the world and physical toughness makes microfossils important for biostratigraphy, while the manner in which they have reacted to environmental changes makes them helpful when reconstructing past environments.

== See also ==
- Biosignature
- Biostratigraphy
- Chemostratigraphy
- Gunflint microfossils
- Macrofossil
- Protists in the fossil record
- Protist shell
- Scale microfossils
- Small carbonaceous fossil

== Other sources ==
- De Wever, Patrick (2020). Marvelous microfossils: creators, timekeepers, architects. Baltimore. ISBN 978-1-4214-3674-6. OCLC 1148175375.
