= Micropaleontology =

Branch of paleontology that studies microfossils

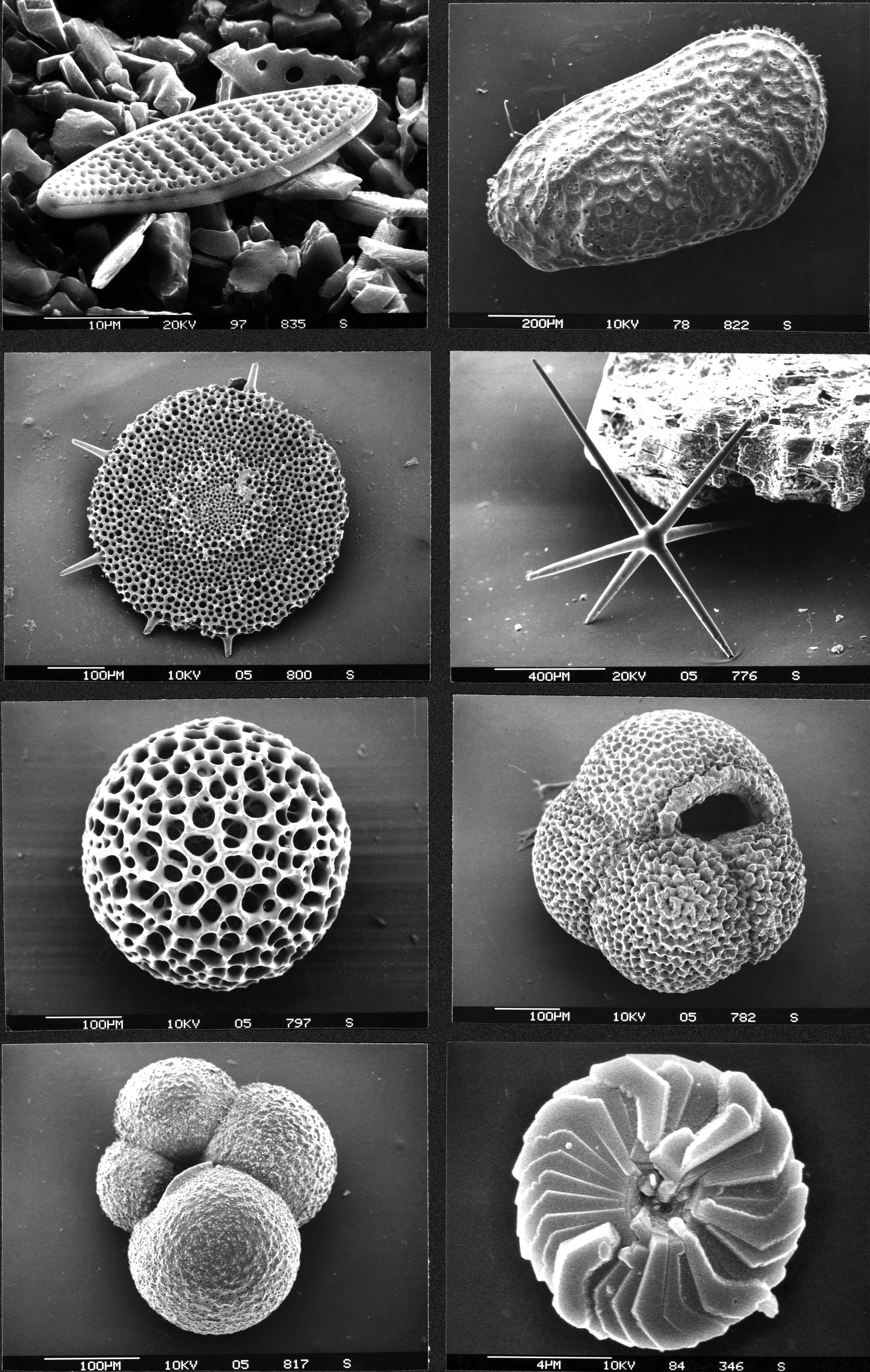
Marine microfossils: (diatom, ostracod, radiolarian, sponge spicule, radiolarian, planktonic foraminiferan (two), coccolith)

Micropaleontology (American spelling; spelled micropalaeontology in European usage) is the branch of paleontology (palaeontology) that studies microfossils, or fossils that require the use of a microscope to see the organism, its morphology and its characteristic details.

== Microfossils ==
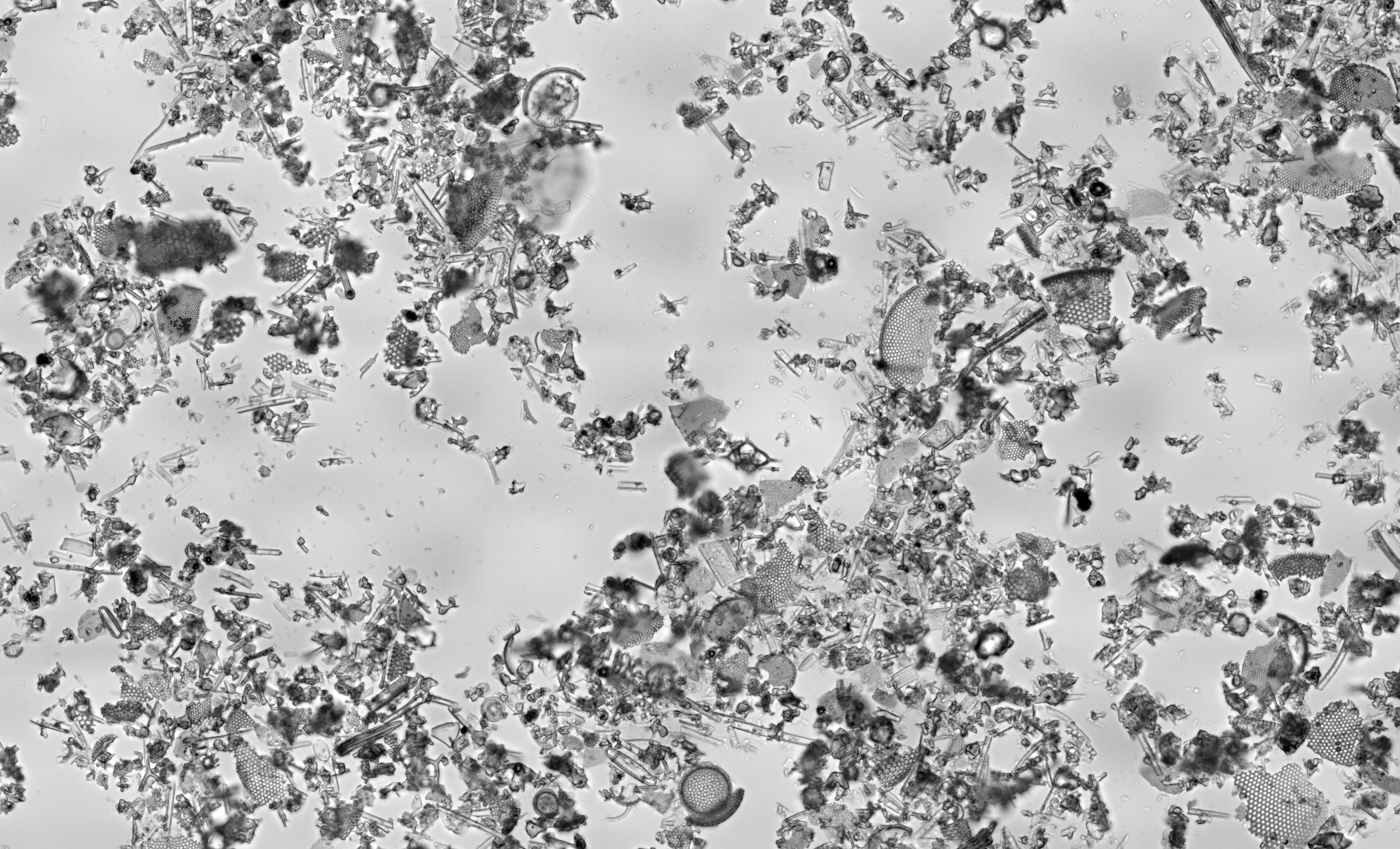
Diatomaceous earth is a soft, siliceous, sedimentary rock made up of microfossils in the form of the frustules (shells) of single cell diatoms. This sample consists of a mixture of centric (radially symmetric) and pennate (bilaterally symmetric) diatoms. This image of diatomaceous earth particles in water is at a scale of 6.236 pixels/μm, the entire image covers a region of approximately 1.13 by 0.69 mm.

Microfossils are fossils that are generally between 0.001mm and 1 mm in size, the study of which requires the use of optical microscopes or electron microscopy. Fossils which can be studied by the naked eye or low-powered magnification, such as a hand lens, are referred to as macrofossils.

For example, some colonial organisms, such as Bryozoa (especially the Cheilostomata) have relatively large colonies, but are classified by fine skeletal details of the small individuals of the colony.

In another example, many fossil genera of Foraminifera, which are protists, are known from shells (called "tests") that were as big as coins, such as the genus Nummulites.

Microfossils are a common feature of the geological record, from the Precambrian to the Holocene. They are most common in deposits of marine environments, but also occur in brackish water, fresh water and terrestrial sedimentary deposits. While every kingdom of life is represented in the microfossil record, the most abundant forms are protist skeletons or cysts from the Chrysophyta, Pyrrhophyta, Sarcodina, acritarchs and chitinozoans, together with pollen and spores from the vascular plants.

In 2017, fossilized microorganisms, or microfossils, were announced to have been discovered in hydrothermal vent precipitates in the Nuvvuagittuq Belt of Quebec, Canada that may be as old as 4.28 billion years old, the oldest record of life on Earth, suggesting "an almost instantaneous emergence of life" (in a geological time-scale sense), after ocean formation 4.41 billion years ago, and not long after the formation of the Earth 4.54 billion years ago. Nonetheless, life may have started even earlier, at nearly 4.5 billion years ago, as claimed by some researchers.

== Areas of study ==
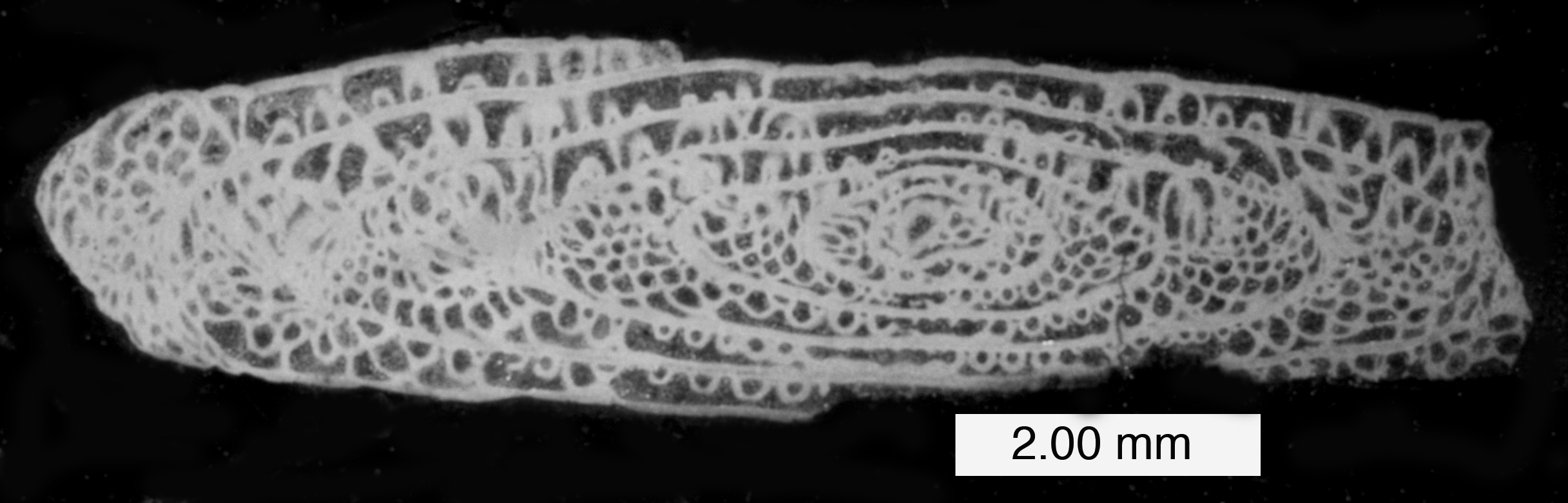
Fusulinid (Triticites) from the Plattsmouth Chert, Red Oak, Iowa (Permian).

Micropaleontology can be roughly divided into four areas of study on the basis of microfossil composition: (a) calcareous, as in coccoliths and foraminifera, (b) phosphatic, as in the study of some vertebrates, (c) siliceous, as in diatoms and radiolaria, or (d) organic, as in the pollen and spores studied in palynology.

This division reflects differences in the mineralogical and chemical composition of microfossil remains (and therefore in the methods of fossil recovery) rather than any strict taxonomic or ecological distinctions. Most researchers in this field, known as micropaleontologists, are typically specialists in one or more taxonomic groups.

=== Calcareous microfossils ===
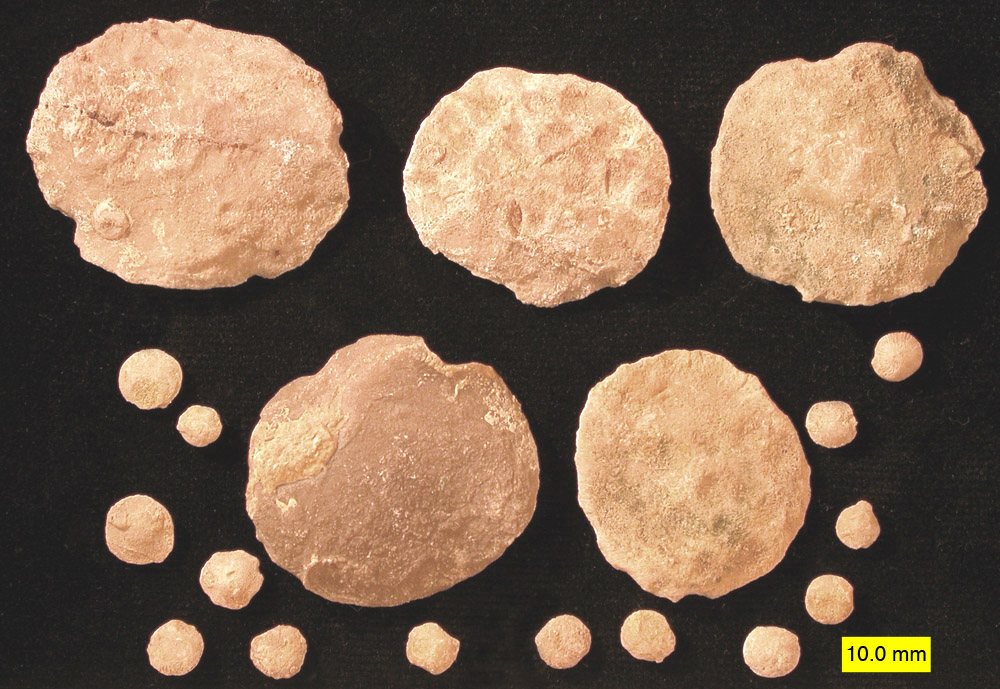
Fossil nummulitid foraminiferans showing microspheric and megalospheric individuals; Eocene of the United Arab Emirates; scale in mm.

Calcareous (CaCO_{3}) microfossils include coccoliths, foraminifera, calcareous dinoflagellate cysts, and ostracods (seed shrimp).

=== Phosphatic microfossils ===
Phosphatic microfossils include conodonts (tiny oral structures of an extinct chordate group), some scolecodonts ("worm" jaws), shark spines and teeth, and other fish remains (collectively called "ichthyoliths").

=== Siliceous microfossils ===
Siliceous microfossils include diatoms, radiolarians, silicoflagellates, ebridians, phytoliths, some scolecodonts ("worm" jaws), and sponge spicules.

=== Organic microfossils ===
The study of organic microfossils is called palynology. Organic microfossils include pollen, spores, chitinozoans (thought to be the egg cases of marine invertebrates), scolecodonts ("worm" jaws), acritarchs, dinoflagellate cysts, and fungal remains.

== Methods ==
Sediment or rock samples are collected from either cores or outcrops, and the microfossils they contain are extracted by a variety of physical and chemical laboratory techniques, including sieving, density separation by centrifuge or in heavy liquids, and chemical digestion of the unwanted fraction. The resulting concentrated sample of microfossils is then mounted on a slide for analysis, usually by light microscope. Taxa are then identified and counted. The enormous numbers of microfossils that a small sediment sample can often yield allows the collection of statistically robust datasets which can be subjected to multivariate analysis. A typical microfossil study will involve identification of a few hundred specimens from each sample.

== Application of micropaleontology ==
Microfossils are specially noteworthy for their importance in biostratigraphy. Since microfossils are often extremely abundant, widespread, and quick to appear and disappear from the stratigraphic record, they constitute ideal index fossils from a biostratigraphic perspective. Also, the planktonic and nektonic habits of some microfossils give them the bonus of appearing across a wide range of facies or paleoenvironments, as well as having near-global distribution, making biostratigraphic correlation even more powerful and effective.

Microfossils, particularly from deep-sea sediments, also provide some of the most important records of global environmental change on long, medium or short timescales. Across vast areas of the ocean floor, the shells of planktonic micro-organisms sinking from surface waters provide the dominant source of sediment, and they continuously accumulate (typically at rates of 20–50 million per million years). Study of changes in assemblages of microfossils and changes in their shell chemistry (e.g., oxygen isotope composition) are fundamental to research on climate change in the geological past.

In addition to providing an excellent tool for sedimentary rock dating and for paleoenvironmental reconstruction – heavily used in both petroleum geology and paleoceanography – micropaleontology has also found a number of less orthodox applications, such as its growing role in forensic police investigation or in determining the provenance of archaeological artefacts.

Micropaleontology is also a tool of geoarchaeology used in the archaeological reconstruction of human habitation sites and environments. Changes in the microfossil population abundance in the stratigraphy of current and former water bodies reflect changes in environmental conditions. Naturally occurring ostracods in freshwater bodies are impacted by changes in salinity and pH due to human activities. When correlated with other dating techniques, prehistoric environments can be reconstructed. Work on Lake Tanganyika provided a profile of human-induced environmental changes of a 4,000-year period.

Similar work in the arid American Southwest has provided information on irrigation canals used by prehistoric peoples from 2100 B.C. to 500 B.C. Other archaeological work in arid climates throughout the Americas has incorporated micropaleontological analysis to build a more complete picture of prehistoric climate and human activity.

== See also ==
- Paleovirology
- Protists in the fossil record
  - List of prehistoric foraminiferans
- The Micropalaeontological Society
