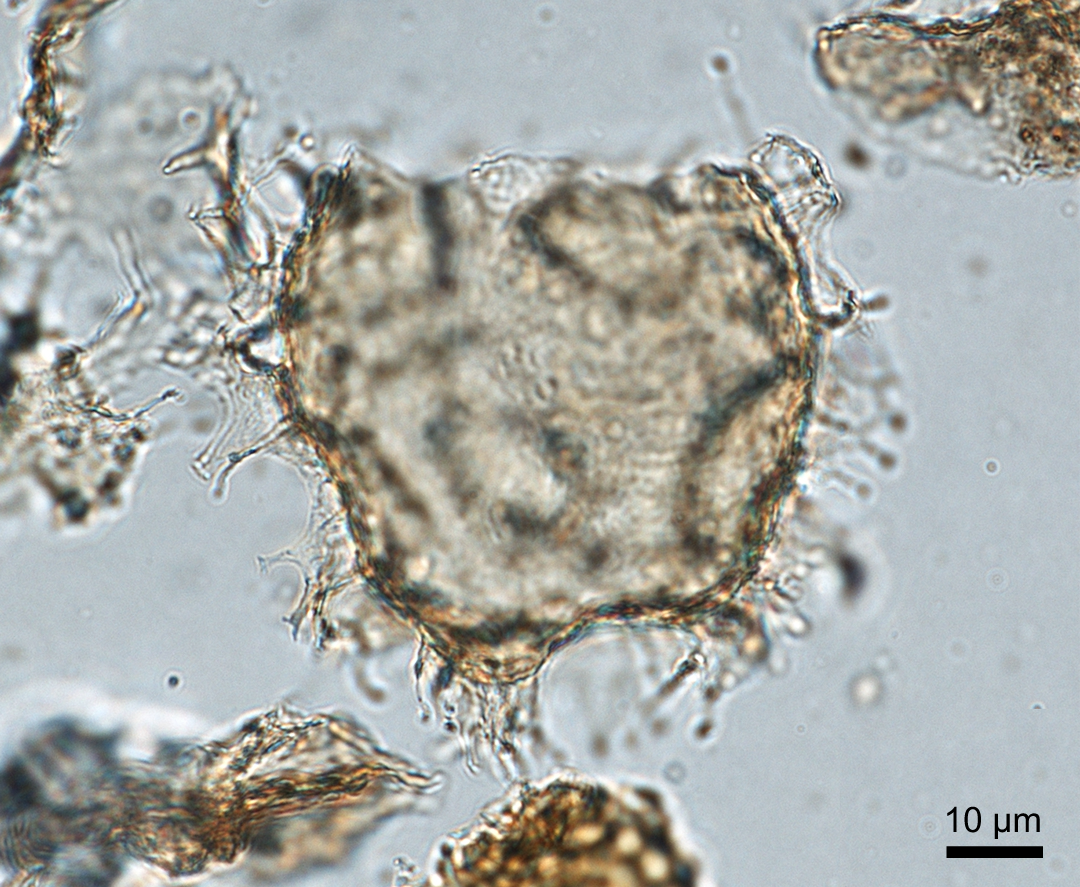
- Bright-field photomicrograph of Palynodinium grallator produced by Sandy McLachlan, University of Victoria from the Oyster Bay Formation of eastern Vancouver Island.

Scientific classification
- Domain: Eukaryota
- Clade: Sar
- Clade: Alveolata
- Phylum: Dinoflagellata
- Class: Dinophyceae
- Order: Gonyaulacales
- Family: †Areoligeraceae
- Genus: †Palynodinium; H.Gocht, 1970

= Palynodinium =

Extinct genus of dinoflagellate cysts

Palynodinium is an extinct genus of organic-walled dinoflagellate cyst (or dinocyst). It is a fossil species of dinoflagellate cyst used to demarcate the K/Pg boundary, which marks the terminal Cretaceous and the extinction of the dinosaurs. Palynodinium grallator was among the microfossils which lead to the recent discovery of the K/Pg event record in marine sediments of the northeast Pacific.

Dinoflagellate cysts are estimated to be produced by 10–16% of living dinoflagellates as a dormant, zygotic stage of their life cycle, which can accumulate in marine sediments as microfossils. Organic-walled dinoflagellate cysts are noted for their resistance to degradation owing to their composition of dinosporin, a biopolymer similar to sporopolinin characteristic of many terrestrial palynomorphs. Their abundance, cosmopolitan distribution, and quality of preservation in the fossil record since the Middle Triassic make dinoflagellate cysts excellent indicators of primary productivity as well as tools for biostratigraphy and paleoenvironmental reconstructions. The scope of dinoflagellate cyst applications has resulted in ongoing collaborative efforts between industry and academia to refine their taxonomic classification and enhance their utility through database organization.
