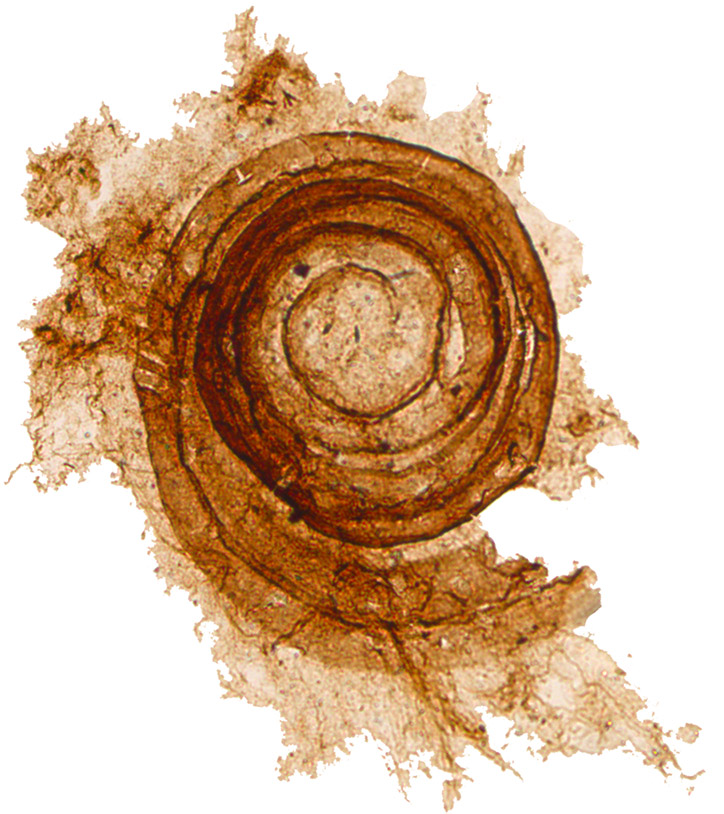
- Cochleatina canilovica

Scientific classification
- (unranked): incertae sedis
- Genus: †Cochleatina; Aseeva, 1974

= Cochleatina =

Cochleatina Temporal range: Ediacaran – Fortunian

Cambrian microfossil

Cochleatina is an organic-walled microfossil ('Small Carbonaceous Fossil') known from the late Ediacaran period and early Cambrian Fortunian Stage. Cochleatina comprises a complex spiral ribbon structure, with a serrated outer margin. These spirals are frequently found embedded in an organic sheet. Cochleatina is a rare example of a fossil taxon known to span the Ediacaran–Cambrian boundary.

== Affinity ==
Cochleatina's biological affinity is unknown. It has been variously regarded as the fossil remains of an animal, an algae, or a protist.
