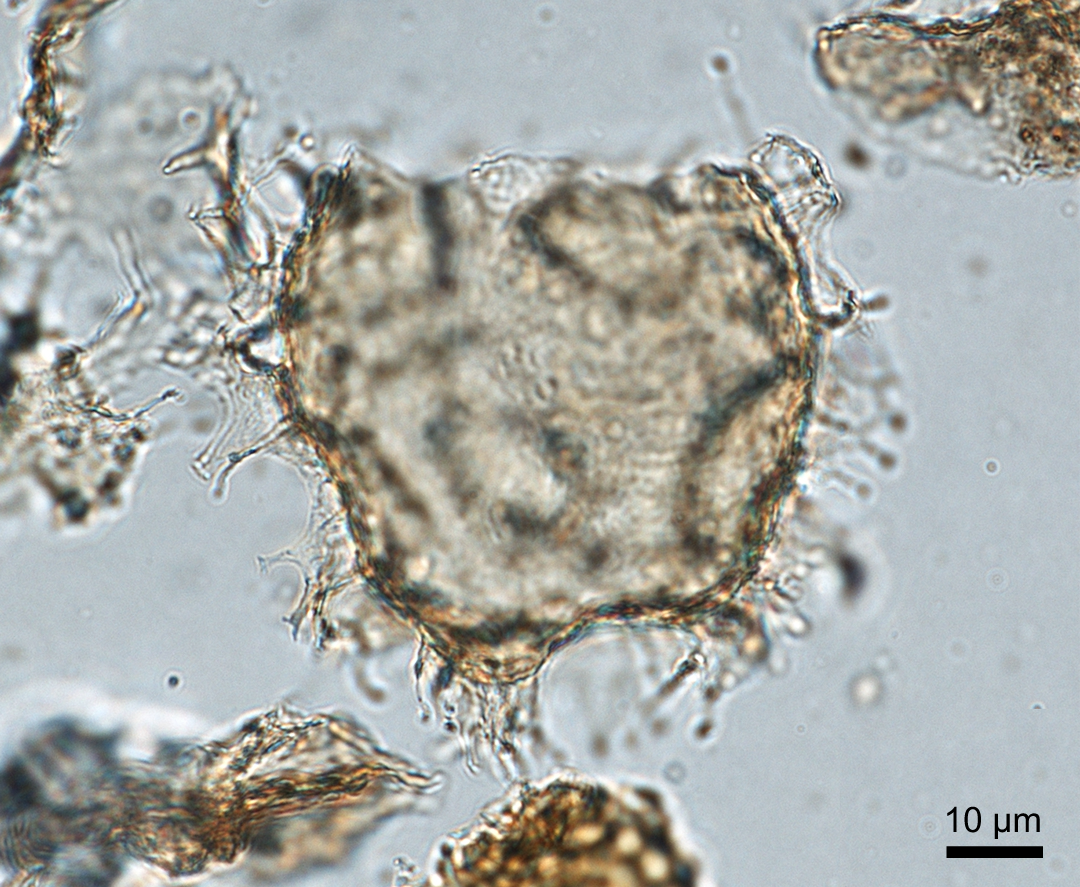
- Bright-field photomicrograph of Palynodinium grallator produced by Sandy McLachlan, University of Victoria from the Oyster Bay Formation of eastern Vancouver Island.

Scientific classification
- Domain: Eukaryota
- Clade: Sar
- Clade: Alveolata
- Division: Dinoflagellata
- Class: Dinophyceae
- Order: Gonyaulacales
- Family: †Areoligeraceae; Evitt, 1963

Genera
- †Areoligera Lejeune-Carpentier, 1938; †Atlantodinium M. Zotto, W.S. Drugg & D. Habib, 1987; †Canningia I.C. Cookson & A. Eisenack, 1960; †Canninginopsis I.C. Cookson & A. Eisenack, 1962; †Cassidium Drugg, 1967; †Cauveridinium Khowaja-Ateequzzaman & Jain, 1990; †Chiropteridium H. Gocht, 1960; †Circulodinium G. Alberti, 1961; †Cyclonephelium Deflandre & Cookson, 1955; †Gerdiocysta M. Liengjarern, L. Costa & C. Downie, 1980; †Glaphyrocysta L.E. Stover & W.R. Evitt, 1978; †Licracysta R.A. Fensome, G.R. Guerstein & G.L. Williams, 2007; †Membranophoridium Gerlach, 1961; †Palynodinium H. Gocht, 1970; †Ramidinium G.R. Guerstein, R.A. Fensome & G.L. Williams, 1998; †Renidinium P. Morgenroth, 1968; †Riculacysta L.E. Stover, 1977; †Senoniasphaera R.F.A. Clarke & J.P. Verdier, 1967; †Tenua Eisenack, 1958

= Areoligeraceae =

Extinct family of dinocysts

Areoligeraceae is an extinct family of dinoflagellates in the order Gonyaulacales.
