= Small carbonaceous fossil =

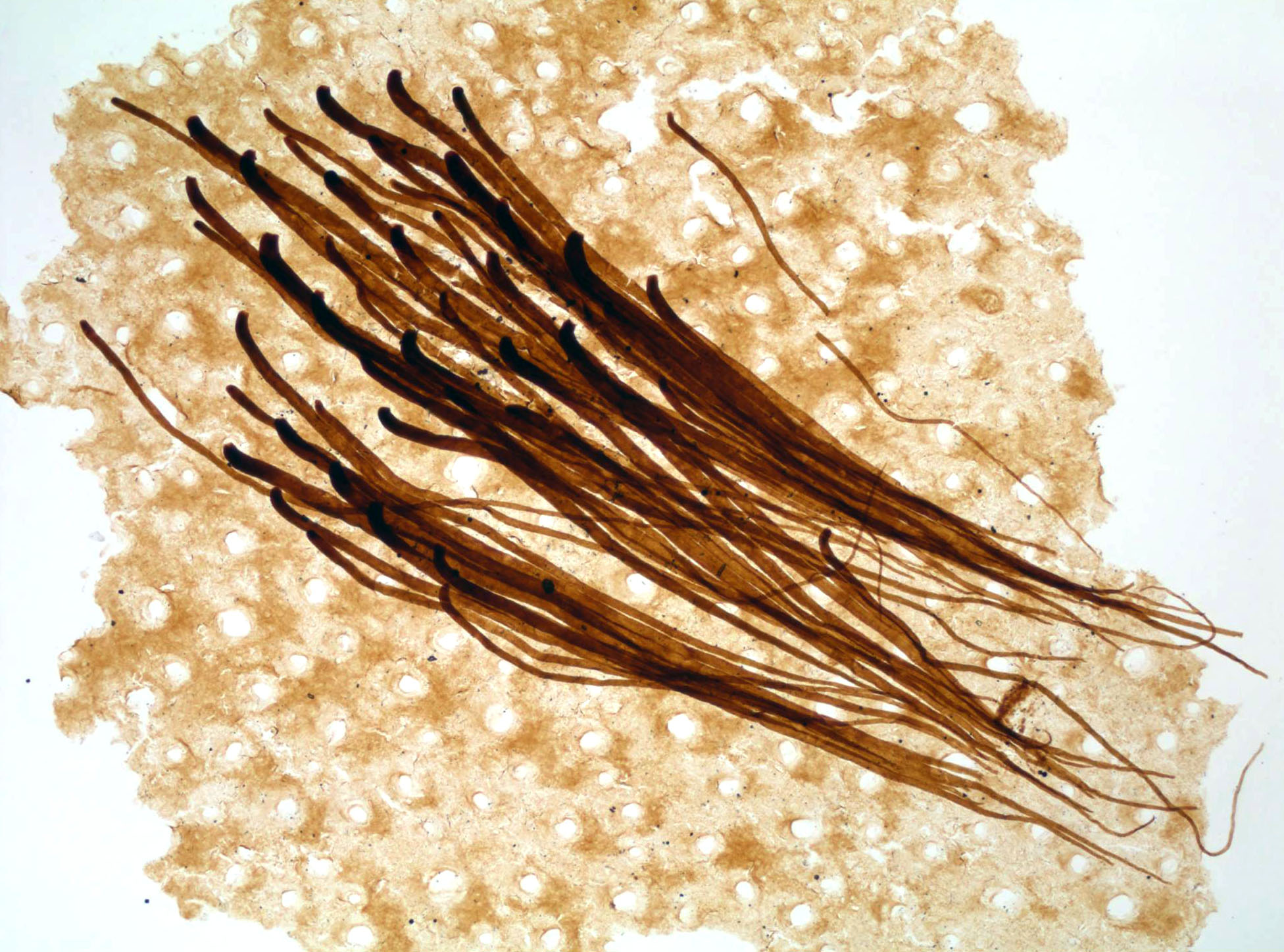
A fragment of Silurian arthropod cuticle with attached setae, extracted by delicate acid maceration

Small carbonaceous fossils (SCFs) are sub-millimetric organic remains of organisms preserved in sedimentary strata.

This category of fossils has traditionally included robust or thick-walled entities such as plant spores, acritarchs and chitinozoa, but the term 'SCFs' is usually applied to more fragile remnants of animals that can only be extracted through a delicate maceration technique. SCFs are relatively widespread and abundant, and can potentially preserve both mineralized and non-mineralized parts of organisms. Since SCFs can preserve the remains of non-biomineralized organisms, they have been viewed as a relatively untapped record of animal evolution, which has the potential to circumvent some of the biases of the shelly fossil record.

== Extraction ==
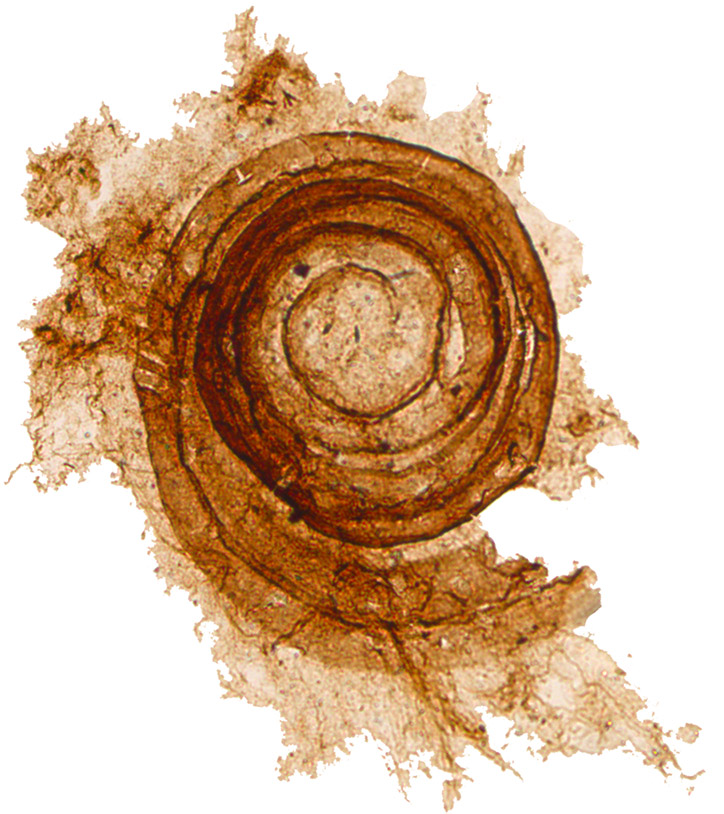
Cochleatina, a small, shelled microfossil with uncertain affinities

SCFs are typically preserved in fine-grained siliciclastic rocks, and are too small to be fruitfully examined on bedding planes. Instead, they are extracted by dissolving the rock in acid. Traditional palynological preparations involve high-energy steps such as centrifuging that destroy large and fragile fossils. In the more delicate technique pioneered by Butterfield, individual microfossils are picked from sieved acid residues by hand. The sieving stage removes crystalline residue, making it easier to extract fossils, but introduces a filter: the smallest fossils (<~40 μm) pass through the sieve and are lost. Once extracted, fossils can be mounted for light or scanning electron microscopy: transmitted light illuminates internal microstructures, whereas SEM picks out surface features.

== Preservation ==
SCFs are best preserved in environments that had anoxic conditions and where the sediments have not been subject to high temperatures (limited thermal maturity); the presence of oxygen is particularly deleterious at high temperatures.

== Biota ==
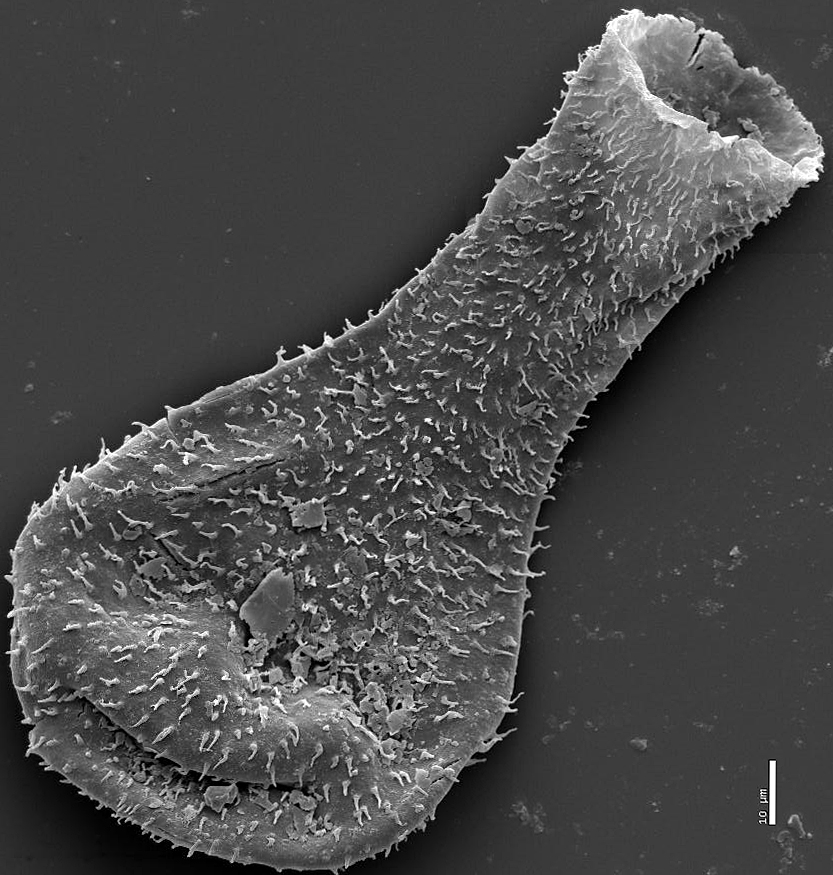
Scanning electron micrograph of a late Silurian chitinozoan, an enigmatic Palaeozoic SCF that can be recovered by the standard palynological technique. Scale bar: 50 μm

Traditional palynological methods are designed for extracting fossilized plant spores and other resistant organic microfossils such as acritarchs and chitinozoa. By using the modified SCFs extraction technique, more delicate fossil structures can also be recovered, including fragments of animals. In particular, this technique has been applied to sediments deposited during the Cambrian Period, since there is great interest in tracking how soft-bodied animals evolved during this time interval. Animal SCFs extracted from Cambrian sediments include the minute scales of priapulid worms, Wiwaxia sclerites, and arthropod feeding parts, for example. These organisms are not represented in the conventional (shelly) fossil record, and so the SCFs record provides data on their distribution and evolution that would not otherwise be available. Lagerstätten such as the Burgess Shale provide isolated snapshots of Palaeozoic life, whereas SCFs provide a more continuous record, albeit blighted by the fragmentary (and consequently enigmatic) nature of many of its constituents. As such, SCFs can help to fill in some of the details of the fossil record outside the rare Lagerstätten sites: for instance, highlighting the rapid nature of the Cambrian explosion.
