= Siliceous dinoflagellate cysts =

Some siliceous remains from the Eocene of Barbados can be interpreted as dinoflagellate thecae of the dinoflagellate genera Lithoperidinium, Jusella, Sieblosphera and Peridinites. These have previously been interpreted as dinocysts.
