= Scolecodont =

Jaw of a polychaete annelid

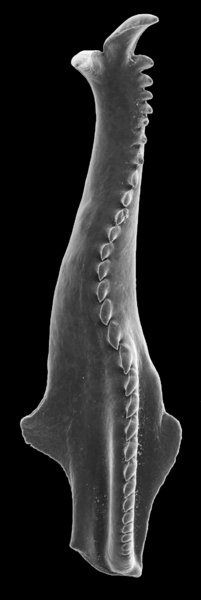
An Ordovician scolecodont from Estonia

A scolecodont is the jaw of a polychaete annelid, a common type of fossil-producing segmented worm useful in invertebrate paleontology. Scolecodonts are common and diverse microfossils, which range from the Cambrian period (around half a billion years ago at the start of the Paleozoic era) to the present. They diversified profusely in the Ordovician, and are most common in the Ordovician, Silurian and Devonian marine deposits of the Paleozoic era.

Relatedly, more problematic worm-like fossils have been described in even older, Neoproterozoic era deposits in the Ediacaran Hills of southern Australia and in mid-Cambrian deposits of Burgess Shale in British Columbia.

Since the other classes of annelids (specifically, the earthworms and leeches) lack hard parts, only the sea-dwelling polychaetes are frequently represented in the fossil record. Polychaetes are commonly fossilized due to their chitinous teeth and their dwelling tubes made of durable calcite (a calcium carbonate), hardened mucus (a.k.a. parchment), and/or chitin-like cement.

== Taxonomy ==
Scolecodonts belonging to the extinct families Atraktoprionidae, Hadoprionidae, Kalloprionidae, Mochtyellidae, Paulinitidae, Polychaetaspidae, Ramphoprionidae, Rhytiprionidae, Skalenoprionidae, Symmetroprionidae, Xanioprionidae, and the still-extant (living) family Oenonidae (which includes the Arabellidae) are known from Silurian rocks in Scotland. Scolecodonts representing the present-day families Onuphidae and Dorvilleidae first appeared in Mesozoic era deposits.

== History ==
Segments of the fossil jaw of a polychaete worm were first reported from Silurian strata on the Estonian island of Saaremaa in 1854, but they were misinterpreted as fish teeth. A year later, impressions of whole polychaete worms with poorly preserved jaws were described from Italian Tertiary deposits. Subsequently, E. Ehlers, a specialist on recent polychaetes, recorded them from the Jurassic Solenhofen Stone of Bavaria, Germany, demonstrating their affinity and proposing the generic names Eunicites and Lumbriconereites. Extensive studies in the late 19th century by George J. Hinde of material from England, Wales, Canada and Sweden established a basis for the nomenclature of what he regarded as isolated components of annelid jaws; but study of them lapsed thereafter for almost 50 years.
