= Dinosporin =

Organic compound

Dinosporin is a macromolecular, highly resistant organic compound which forms or partly forms, the enclosing wall of fossilizable organic-walled dinoflagellate cysts.

== Composition ==
The walls of organic-walled dinocysts are composed of the resistant biopolymer called dinosporin. This organic compound has similarities to sporopollenin, but is unique to dinoflagellates. Resistant biopolymers are non-hydrolyzable and fossilizable macromolecular organic compounds present in many microalgal cell walls and fossil palynomorphs. Thus far, only the motile stage of Gymnodinium catenatum has been shown to produce the highly aliphatic biopolymer algaenan. Dinosporin has been shown to be a significantly different biopolymer from algaenan, which demonstrates that dinoflagellates are able to produce a completely different biomacromolecule for their resting cysts. Previous descriptions of dinosporin having similar properties to sporopollenin were based on both compounds’ resistance to hydrolysis and high preservation potential. However, further research has instead shown that dinosporin is compositionally distinct. Despite the clear distinction between dinosporin and other resistant biopolymer groups, very little is known about the actual structure of dinosporin. A recent study has suggested that dinosporin present in cysts of Lingulodinium polyedrum does not contain significant amounts of long chain aliphatics, nor is it primarily aromatic, but that it is a highly crosslinked carbohydrate-based polymer. Furthermore, dinosporin may be taxon specific as species within the same genus exhibited different compositions, so that dinosporin may be more accurately thought of as a suite of related but chemically distinguishable biopolymers. Studies of dinosporin composition and structure are complicated by the fact that the cysts have to either have the cell contents effectively removed (cysts generated in culture) or be individually picked (cysts from sediments) in order to ensure sample purity. The culture-derived cysts risk condensation of the cell content and modification of the cyst wall while the cysts picked from sediment are time consuming to acquire and may have been altered by post-mortem processes. For example, the macromolecular composition of the fossil dinoflagellate cyst Thalassiphora pelagica was analyzed, but post-mortem alteration was noted. Furthermore, dinocysts can be subject to selective preservation . This has been speculated to reflect different dinosporin compositions in various dinocyst lineages, but so far, no conclusive differences have been shown. Recent Fourier-transform infrared spectroscopy (FTIR) work shows both differences and similarities between the major dinocyst lineages, which are suggested to be related to nutritional strategies.
