= Dinocyst =

Dormant cell type of dinoflagellates

Dinocysts or dinoflagellate cysts are typically 15 to 100 μm in diameter and produced by dinoflagellates as a dormant, zygotic stage of their lifecycle, which can accumulate in the sediments as microfossils. Organic-walled dinocysts are often resistant and made out of dinosporin. There are also calcareous dinoflagellate cysts and siliceous dinoflagellate cysts.

== History ==
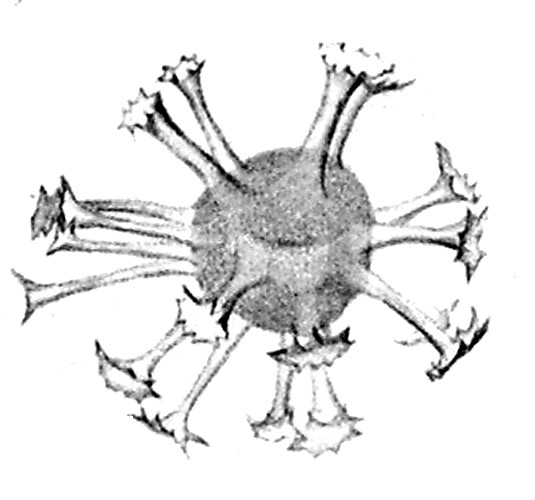
Dinocyst drawn by Ehrenberg in 1837

The first person to recognize fossil dinoflagellates was Christian Gottfried Ehrenberg, who reported his discovery in a paper presented to the Berlin Academy of Sciences in July 1836. He had observed clearly tabulate dinoflagellates in thin flakes of Cretaceous flint and considered those dinoflagellates to have been silicified. Along with them, and of comparable size, were spheroidal to ovoidal bodies bearing an array of spines or tubes of variable character. Ehrenberg interpreted these as being originally siliceous and thought them to be desmids (freshwater conjugating algae), placing them within his own Recent desmid genus Xanthidium. Though summaries of Ehrenberg's work appeared earlier, it was not published in full until 1837 or 1838; the date is uncertain.

A first relation between dinoflagellate thecae and cysts was made through morphological comparison of both by Bill Evitt and Susan E. Davidson. Further evidence came from detailed culture studies of dinoflagellate cysts by David Wall and Barrie Dale at Woods Hole Oceanographic Institution in the sixties.

== Types of cysts ==
Ontologically, the term cyst can apply to (1) a temporary resting state (pellicle, temporary or ecdysal cyst), (2) a dormant zygote (resting cysts or hypnozygotes) or (3) a coccoid condition in which the cells are still photosynthetically active. For example, for this last special case, all cysts described from species of the order Phytodiniales (e.g. Cystodinium, Stylodinium, Hypnodinium, Tetradinium, Dinococcus, Gloeodinium), are coccoid stages.

Digestive cyst or digestion cysts denote pellicle cysts formed after feeding by phagocytosis as in Katodinium fungiforme.

Division cysts refer to non-motile division stages wherein asexual reproduction takes place through division. These are not pellicle or resting cysts since they are not dormant. Similarly, palmelloid or mucilage stages are not pellicle or resting cysts, but stages in which the monad loses its flagella and becomes enveloped in multilayered mucilage wherein division takes place.

== Taxonomy ==
Dinoflagellate cysts described in the literature have been linked to a particular motile stage through morphological similarities and/or co-occurrence in the same population/culture or through the technique of establishing the so-called cyst-theca relation by incubation of the cysts. Geologists use a cyst-based taxonomy, whilst biologists use a motile-stage based taxonomy. Therefore, cysts can have different names than the corresponding motile stages. Living cysts can be easily isolated from the sediment using sodium polytungstate, a heavy liquid. Another method, rarely used, uses a sucrose gradient. Recent times have brought about the possibility to get molecular sequences from single cysts or single cells. The proportion of cyst-forming species for marine dinoflagellates is between 15 and 20% and for freshwater dinoflagellates 24%. The tabulation of the Dinoflagellate is sometimes mirrored in the tabulation (previously called paratabulation) of the dinocyst, allowing species to be deduced from the cyst. It has previously been suggested that morphological characters from the cyst stage may be phylogenetically important in marine species and this may to an even greater extent be the case for freshwater dinoflagellates, confirmed by new observations and recently reviewed. Several books document general cyst taxonomy. There are few guides for determination of marine Quaternary dinocysts. Many new species are still being described for the Neogene, which covers the Miocene, the Pliocene and the Quaternary, which covers the Pleistocene and recent.

== Size ==
Quaternary dinocysts are typically between 15 and 100 μm in diameter. One of the smallest recent cysts is the cyst of Pentapharsodinium dalei, which can be as small as 19 μm in length. One of the largest recent cysts is the cyst of Protoperidinium latissimum, which can be as large as 100 μm in length.

== Composition ==
The walls of organic-walled dinocysts are composed of the resistant biopolymer called dinosporin. This organic compound has similarities to sporopollenin, but is unique to dinoflagellates.

In addition to organic-walled cysts, there are also calcareous dinoflagellate cysts and siliceous dinoflagellate cysts.

== Morphological terms ==
In pure morphological terms, a dinocyst can be described as the body formed by the cyst wall, as well as the space it encloses and all the spaces within it. Cysts may develop their wall immediately within the theca, and such cysts are called proximate. Alternatively, the cyst may comprise a more or less spherical central body with processes or crests, and such cysts are termed chorate or proximochorate. Cysts may have a single-layered wall (autophragm), a two-layered wall (comprising an outer periphragm and an inner endophragm) or a three-layered wall (ectophragm, periphragm and endophragm if the outer wall is structurally supported, or otherwise periphragm, mesophragm and endophragm). Cysts with two or more wall layers that define a cavity are termed cavate. Excystment usually results in loss of part of, or an opening in, the cyst wall, termed archeopyle, the shape and position of which may indicate the position and/or shape of one or more thecal plates.

Transmission electron microscopy (TEM) studies (e.g.) suggest that endophragm and periphragm are not morphologically separable. Therefore, the use of the terms pedium and luxuria are suggested instead. Within the cyst wall, a thick cellulose-like layer called the endospore is present which is birefringent under crossed nichols. Cysts may be identified using the overall body shape but more often based on the characteristic furrows housing the flagella (cingulum and sulcus) or details of the patterns of plates covering many motiles (thecal tabulation). The one distinctive feature common to all cysts is the excystment opening (archaeopyle) through which the emerging new motile stage exits. In many cases this reflects a recognizable part of the tabulation (one or more plates). However, one large group of dinoflagellates (athecate - or naked dinoflagellates) do not have thecal plates and therefore produce cysts lacking all forms of reflected tabulation.

== Cyst ultrastructure ==
There have been very few ultrastructural studies of marine cysts with TEM, except for early on Hystrichosphaea bentorii, on Hystrichosphaeridium, Impletosphaeridium, Lingulodinium machaerophorum and Operculodinium centrocarpum and Bitectatodinium tepikiense and more recent work on Lingulodinium machaerophorum and Alexandrium.

Some freshwater cysts have been investigated with TEM, such as Ceratium hirundinella.

== Relation to life cycle ==
Resting cysts are traditionally associated with the sexual cycle of dinoflagellates. Induced by particular triggers such as changes in temperature, nutrients, etc., dinoflagellates undergo gamete formation. The gametes fuse to form the planozygote and undergo encystment: they form cysts within the thecae of the planozygote. These rapidly sink to the sediment. Many species may spend longer periods resting in the sediment than active in the water column. Resting stages also constitute a reservoir of genetic diversity, which increases the survival potential of the populations. Thus, dinoflagellate cysts have great ecological importance and act as "seed banks", comparable to those found in terrestrial ecosystems. The encysted forms may remain viable for up to 100 years. Sediment can be stored with live Lingulodinium cysts for at least 18 months. Cysts often need triggers to germinate ('excyst'), such as changes in temperature, nutrients, etc. Some cysts, such as Scrippsiella acuminata, require light to germinate.

== Distribution and ecology of organic-walled dinocysts ==
Dinocyst distribution is mainly studied through studies of surface sediments. Many studies are regional, such as the Iberian Margin the North Sea, Kiel bight, Celtic Sea, Norwegian Sea, around Iceland, the Southeast Pacific, the Arctic, Equatorial Atlantic, South and Equatorial Atlantic, off West Africa, the Southern Ocean, Benguela upwelling, in the Mediterranean Sea, Caspian Sea, British Columbia, The Northeastern Pacific, Florida, Mexico and Barends Sea.

Such surface sediment studies show that dinoflagellate cyst distribution is controlled by ranges of temperature, salinity and nutrients. This often poses biogeographical boundaries, more particularly temperature. Some species can be clearly related to cold waters. Recent molecular work has shown the presence of such cold-water indicator, a life-stage of Islandinium sp. in Canadian sea-ice for the first time. Other species are thermophilic, such as the "living fossil" Dapsilidinium pastielsii currently found in the Indo-Pacific Warm Pool only.

Eutrophication can also be reflected in dinocyst assemblages.

Cysts can be transported via ocean-currents, which can distort ecological signals. This has been documented for the warm water species Operculodinium israelianum and Polysphaeridium zoharyi which were interpreted to have been transported along the Southern coast of the United States. Cyst are also often transported from the inner shelf to the outer shelf or slope.

Another problem with cysts is that they also get transported with ballast water, which can cause introduction of invasive species.

Seasonality and fluxes are studied through sediment trap studies, which help to understand ecological signals.

== Palaeoecology of organic-walled dinocysts ==
The palaeoecology of marine organic-walled dinoflagellate cysts has been extensively studied, more particularly in the Quaternary. Changes in Quaternary dinocyst assemblages reflect the palaeoceanography through variations in productivity, temperature, salinity and ice cover.

Palynodinium, a fossil species of dinoflagellate cyst, is used to demarcate the K/Pg boundary, which marks the terminal Cretaceous and the extinction of the dinosaurs.

Such reconstructions can be done via semi-quantitative techniques, such as ordination techniques, which can indicate trends in environmental parameters.

A quantitative method is the use of transfer functions, although these have been heavily debated.

Another late Quaternary application is for environmental goals, more particularly the study of eutrophication .

An interval of particular interest during the late Quaternary is the Eemian.

Also during the Neogene, dinocysts have shown to be useful in the Miocene and particularly the Messinian. Also the paleoclimate of the Pliocene has been investigated. Transfer functions have also been attempted during the Pliocene. Some species have been suggested to have different environmental preferences during the Neogene.

The palaeoecology of freshwater dinoflagellate cysts is relatively unexplored, though several recent studies have shown the relation to changes in nutrients, pH and temperature

== Morphological variation of organic-walled dinocysts ==
There is little known about how organic-walled dinocysts are formed except from culture experiments. Cyst formation is suggested to happen through self-assembly processes.

Organic-walled dinocyst morphology is shown to be controlled by changes in salinity and temperature in some species, more particularly process length variation. This is known to be the case for Lingulodinium machaerophorum from culture experiments, and study of surface sediments. Also variations in the morphology of the species Operculodinium centrocarpum can be related to salinity and/or temperature. Also cysts of the species Gonyaulax baltica shows morphological variations in culture, as well as Gonyaulax spinifera. Cyst formed by other species such as Pyrophacus steinii (cyst is called Tuberculodinium vancampoae) do not show a clear relation to variations in salinity.

The morphological variation can be applied for the reconstruction of salinity, in a semi-quantitative or quantitative way. Process length variation of Lingulodinium machaerophorum has been used to reconstruct Black Sea salinity variation.

== Biostratigraphy and evolution of organic-walled dinocysts ==
Organic-walled dinoflagellate cysts have a long geological record with lowest occurrences during the mid Triassic, whilst geochemical markers suggest a presence to the Early Cambrian. Some of the Paleozoic acritarchs possibly are related to dinoflagellate cysts. Arpylorus, from the Silurian of North Africa, was at one time considered to be a dinoflagellate cyst, but this palynomorph is now considered probably an arthropod remain. Another enigmatic form with possible early dinoflagellate affinity is Palaeodinophysis altaica, which was found in the Devonian of Kazakhstan, however Fensome et al. (1999) consider its dinoflagellate affinity (and also supposed age) unlikely.

The fossil record supports a major adaptive radiation of dinoflagellates during later Triassic and earlier Jurassic times. The majority of living thecate dinoflagellates can be interpreted as having either a peridinalean or gonyaulacalean tabulation, and that these tabulations, and hence the orders Gonyaulacales and Peridiniales, have been separate since at least the Early Jurassic. The biostratigraphical application of dinoflagellate cysts has been thoroughly studied. The Pliocene has been recently investigated and also the Miocene.

== Palynological methods ==
Organic-walled dinoflagellate cysts are extracted using palynological methods, which can be highly variable between different palynological laboratories, and often involve use of hydrochloric acid (HCl), hydrofluoric acid (HF) and/or alternative acids at different temperatures. The use of KOH or acetolysis is not advised in dinocyst studies, because this causes swelling and/or destruction of dinocysts. The palynological method can cause difficulty in identification of certain species: it has been shown that cysts of Alexandrium tamarense and of Scrippsiella trifida are difficult to discriminate in samples that have been treated with the palynological method. The concentration of Dinocysts can be quantified by adding an exotic spike or marker such as Lycopodium clavatum spores.

== Biological functions ==
Dinocysts are suggested to have a number of adaptive functions including survival during adverse conditions, bloom initiation and termination, dispersal in time, a seed bank for genetic diversity and dispersal in space.
