= Calcareous dinoflagellate cysts =

Type of cysts

Calcareous dinoflagellate cysts or calcareous dinocysts are dinoflagellate cysts produced by a group of peridinoid dinoflagellates, called calcareous dinoflagellates.

== Definition ==
Organisms producing calcareous structures are exclusively found in a small group of peridinoid dinoflagellates, called calcareous dinoflagellates. Such calcareous structures are either dinocysts (systematized as Calciodinelloideae), which are formed during the life cycle (i.e., mostly hypnozygotes, after sexual reproduction, or resting stages; an overview of potential cyst formations is given by) or found in vegetative stages (namely in Thoracosphaera Kamptner). The potential to produce calcareous structures has been considered as apomorphic within alveolates, arguing for the monophyly of Calciodinellaceae (including Thoracosphaera).

== Distribution and ecology ==
Calciodinellaceae (Peridiniales, Dinophyceae) comprise 35 extant species of calcareous dinophytes, plus about 260 fossil species. They are distributed in cold through tropical seas of the world (neritic and pelagic). Calcareous cysts are deposited in both marine sediments that are coastal and oceanic. The first freshwater dinoflagellate that produces calcareous cysts was recently discovered.

== Fossil record ==
According to the fossil record, calcareous dinoflagellates originate in the Upper Triassic and are highly diverse during the Cretaceous and throughout the Tertiary.

== Systematics ==
Due to their long stratigraphic range, many fossil species (namely their cysts) have been described. By contrast, descriptions of extant species are primarily based on the motile stages (namely on the thecae, which are less diverse). This has led to two distinct systematics: paleontological (with four subordinate groups, primarily based on the cyst wall ultrastructure, of which the c-axes of the crystals are orientated irregularly oblique, regularly radial, regularly tangential, or regularly oblique) and neontological (with the motile taxa Bysmatrum Faust and Steidinger, Ensiculifera Balech, Pentapharsodinium Indelicato and Loeblich III, and Scrippsiella).
