= Tripos elegans =

Scientific classification
- Domain: Eukaryota
- Clade: Diaphoretickes
- Clade: SAR
- Clade: Alveolata
- Phylum: Myzozoa
- Superclass: Dinoflagellata
- Class: Dinophyceae
- Order: Gonyaulacales
- Family: Ceratiaceae
- Genus: Tripos
- Species: T. elegans

Binomial name
- Tripos elegans (Schröder) F.Gómez, 2013

Synonyms
- Ceratium elegans Schröder, 1906

Species of single-celled organism

Tripos elegans is a species of dinoflagellates in the family Ceratiaceae.
