= Climate change in Maine =

Climate change in the US state of Maine

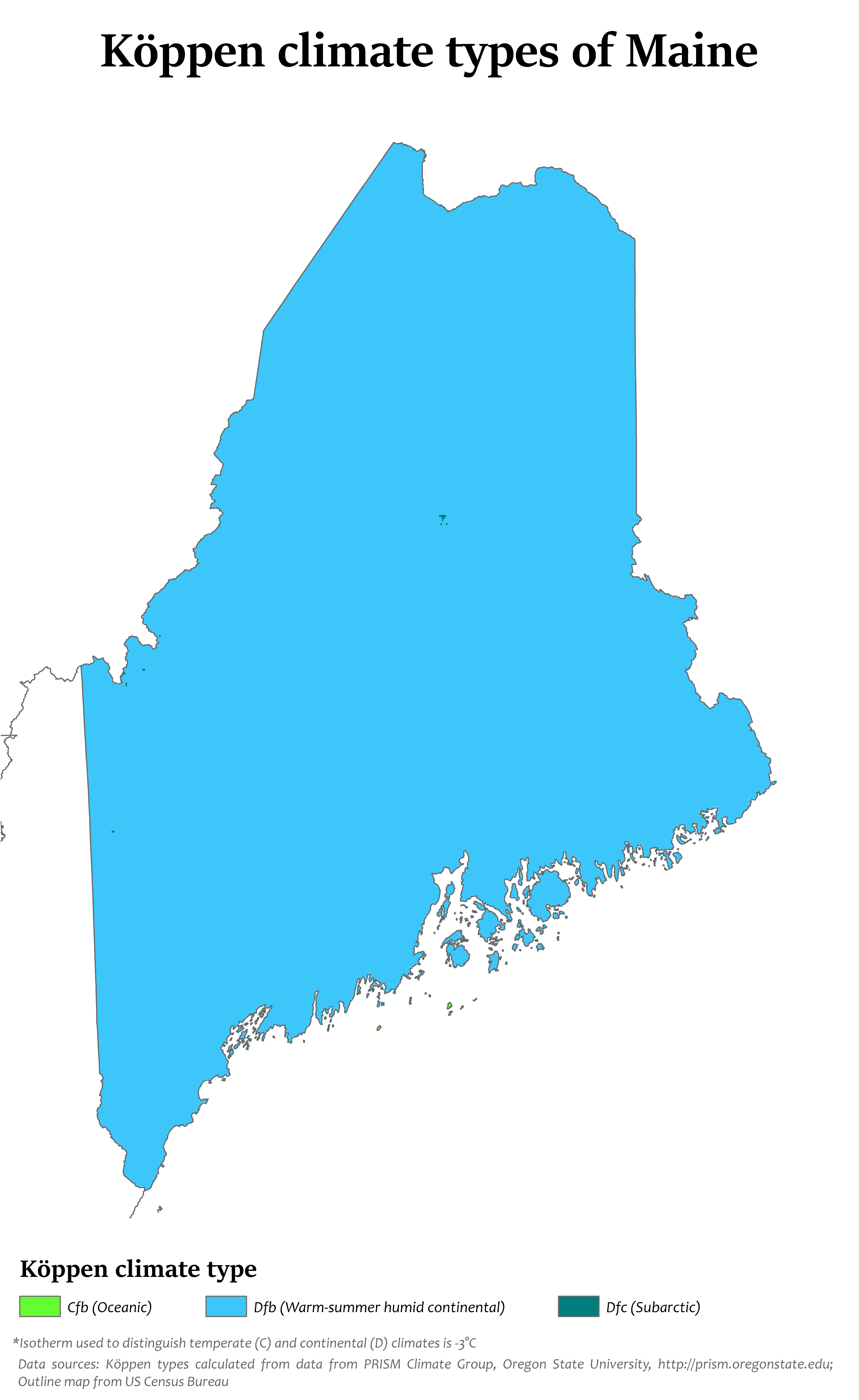
Köppen climate types in Maine, showing the state to be warm-summer humid continental.

Climate change in Maine encompasses the effects of climate change, attributed to man-made increases in atmospheric carbon dioxide, methane, and nitrous oxides, in the U.S. state of Maine. The United States Environmental Protection Agency reports that Maine has warmed roughly three degrees F since 1900. Sea level in Maine has risen eight inches since the 1950s.

In July 2019, Governor Janet Mills signed into law bipartisan legislation aimed at countering the effects of climate change. A 2022 report from the University of New Hampshire Sustainability Institute and the Union of Concerned Scientists found that Maine is leading all other New England states in its climate change response. The Climate Reanalyzer at the University of Maine Climate Change Institute is often mentioned in national and international news reports about heat waves and climate change.

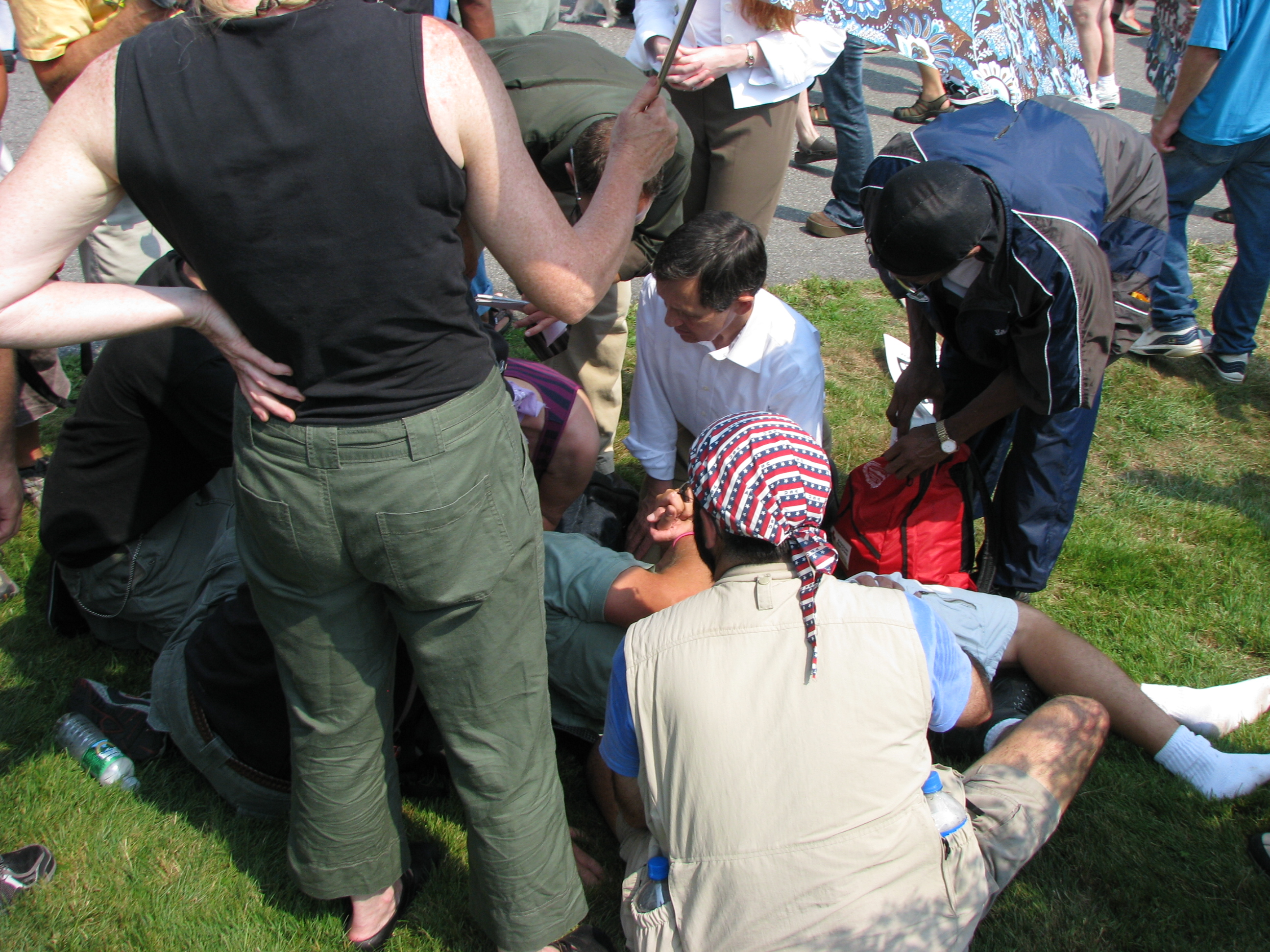
Heat stroke sufferer, 2007

== Increasing temperature and changing precipitation patterns ==
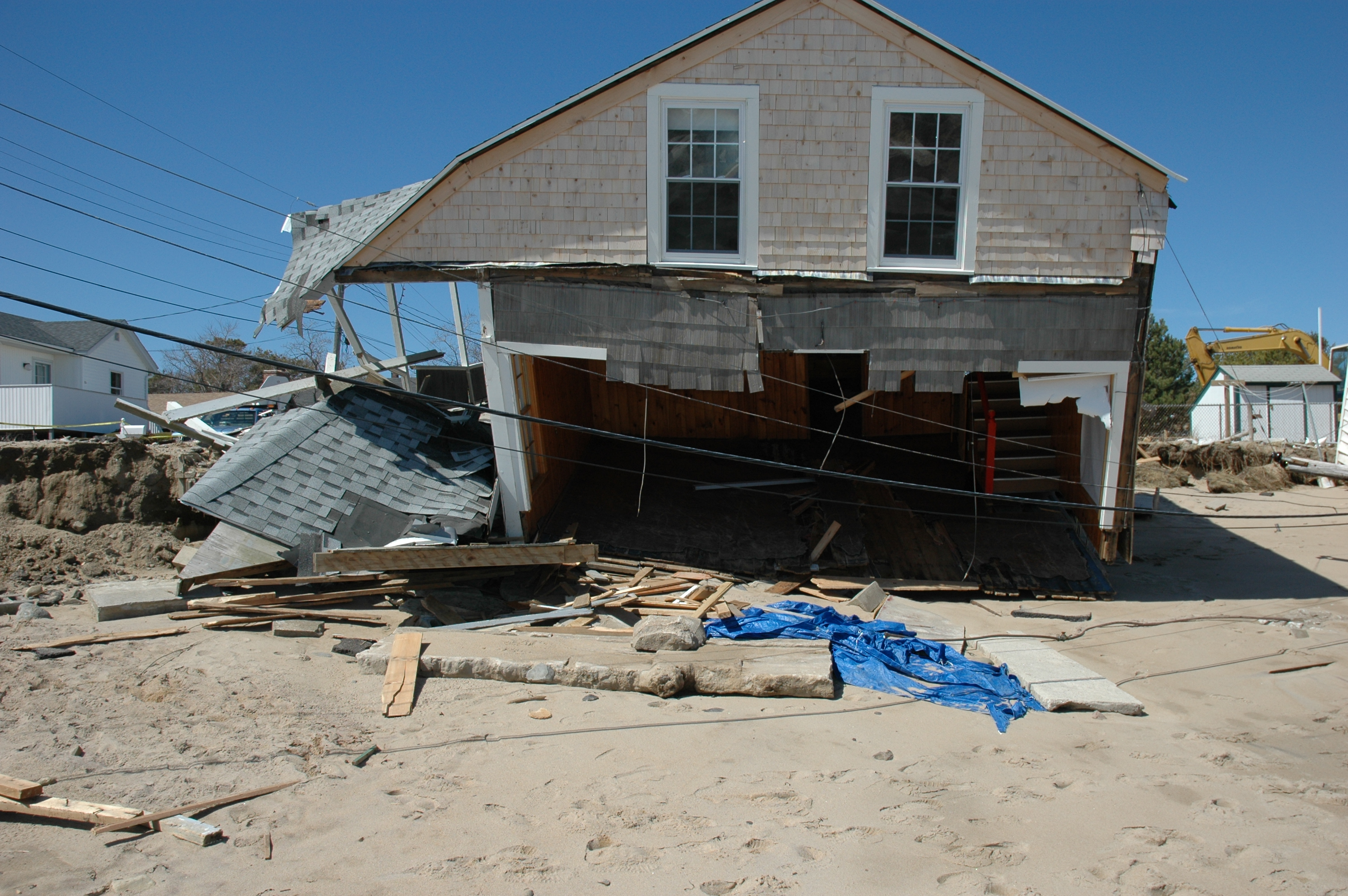
Flood-damaged house, Saco, 2006

Maine is experiencing more rainfall and more intense rainfall events as a result of the changing climate. This is likely to increase the severity of both floods and droughts. The Environmental Protection Agency reported that between 1895 and 2011 average annual precipitation in the Northeast increased 10%. In 2022, the Maine Climate Office reported that the state experienced almost eight inches more rain than the statewide average for the last century. In July 2023, the Portland, Maine area set a heat record when for 32 days the low temperature never dropped below 60 degrees which is the longest stretch of above 60 degree nighttime temperatures since record keeping began in 1940.

== Sea level rise, wetland loss, and coastal flooding ==
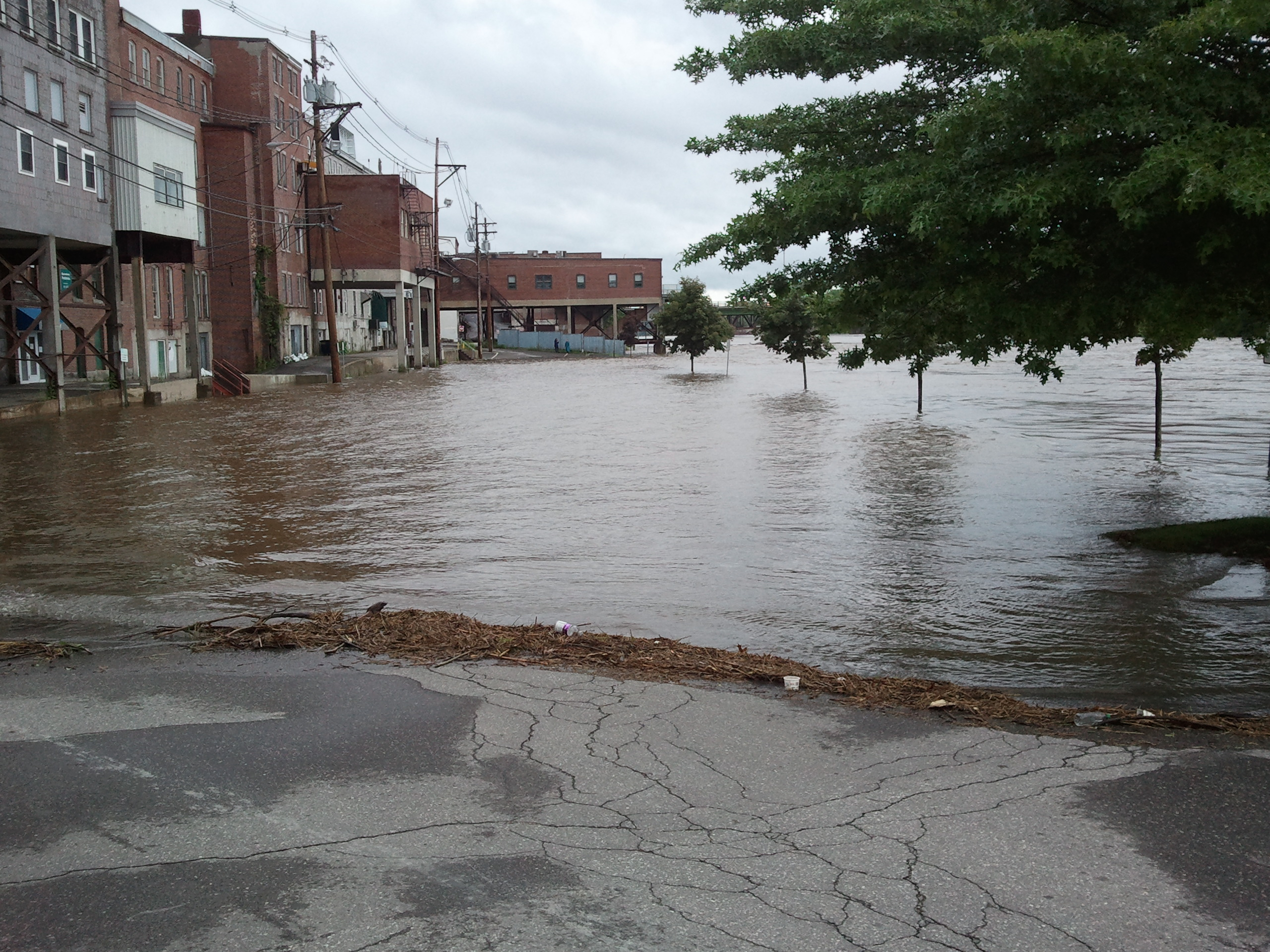
Kennebec River in flood, 2012

Sea level in Maine has risen eight inches since the 1950s. Scientists predict sea levels will rise in Maine roughly a foot and a half in the next 25 years. In 2023, Maine Public reported that despite these predictions "the value of beachfront houses has skyrocketed."

The Camp Ellis community in Saco has been slowing disappearing below the ocean for years. A 2023 report from Southern Maine Planning and Development Commission identifies more than 3,500 properties in Wells, Kennebunk, and York with a combined value of $645 million that are at risk of flooding from the expected 1.6 foot increase in sea level rise over the next 30 years.

The January 2024 Portland flood caused damage to many Portland buildings on piers and located along the waterfront.

The Portsmouth Naval Shipyard is planning a $2 billion renovation of yard facilities, which includes measures to protect against higher tides, storm surges, and the dangerous combination of both. The Union of Concerned Scientists, which issued a 2016 report about military readiness for climate change, estimates that flooding events at the shipyard could rise from the current 10 tidal flood days a year to 80 to 190 tidal flood days per year.

Flooding and rising sea level increases storm damage and erodes beaches and wetland. The practice of filling in wetlands has reduced flood buffers and wildlife habitat. Shorefront buildings and infrastructure are most vulnerable.

== Ecosystems ==
According to the EPA "Changing the climate threatens ecosystems by disrupting relationships between species. Wildflowers and woody perennials are blooming—and migratory birds are arriving—sooner in spring. Not all species adjust in the same way, however, so the food that one species needs may no longer be available when that species arrives on its migration. Warmer temperatures allow deer populations to increase, leading to a loss of forest underbrush, which makes some animals more vulnerable to predators. Climate change can allow invasive species to expand their ranges. For example, the hemlock woolly adelgid has recently infested hemlock trees near the coast in southern Maine. Infestation eventually kills almost all hemlock trees, which are replaced by black oaks, black birch, and other hardwoods. Warmer temperatures are likely to enable the woolly adelgid to expand inland and up the coast. The loss of hemlock trees would remove the primary habitat for the blue-headed vireo and Blackburnian warbler. It could also cause streams to run dry or become excessively warm more often, harming brook trout and brown trout".

=== Phytoplankton decline in the Gulf of Maine ===
Researchers at the Bigelow Laboratory for Ocean Sciences have been monitoring the Gulf of Maine for 25 years. Phytoplankton are crucial microscopic plants at the bottom of the food chain. The data has demonstrated that phytoplankton productivity in the Gulf of Maine dropped 65% between 2001 and 2018.

=== Harmful Algal Blooms in the Gulf of Maine ===
An example of a Harmful Algal Bloom as seen from the air.

A harmful algal bloom (HAB) occurs when toxin-producing algae grow excessively in a body of water. One of the most potent and commonly found genus of algae which contribute to harmful algal blooms is Pseudo-nitzschia. Many species within Pseudo-nitzschia produce domoic acid, a neurotoxin that bioaccumulates in shellfish, causing illness in humans and marine animals upon ingestion. HABs occur when conditions in the water are hyper-conducive for algae growth and the amount of algae, in most cases Pseudo-nitzschia, grows exponentially.

In the Gulf of Maine, the occurrence of HABs have increased with many associating it with climate change. HABs have forced the closure of some New England shellfish beds to harvesting in recent years, causing a lapse in the region's clam, mussel and oyster supplies. Outbreaks in 2005 and 2008 were particularly harmful, resulting in extended closures.

The effects of climate change are diverse and broad, many of which contribute to increased HAB presence. Higher levels of carbon dioxide in the air and water can lead to rapid growth of algae. Increased sea levels would create more shallow and stable coastal water, conditions that are perfect for the growth of algae. Harmful algae usually bloom during the warm summer season or when water temperatures are warmer than usual. Warmer water due to climate change might favor the bloom of harmful algae like Pseudo-nitzschia.

In 2023, scientists were tracking an unusually large bloom of non-toxic phytoplankton, Tripos muelleri, that covered one-third of the 36,000-square-mile Gulf of Maine.

=== Fall foliage ===
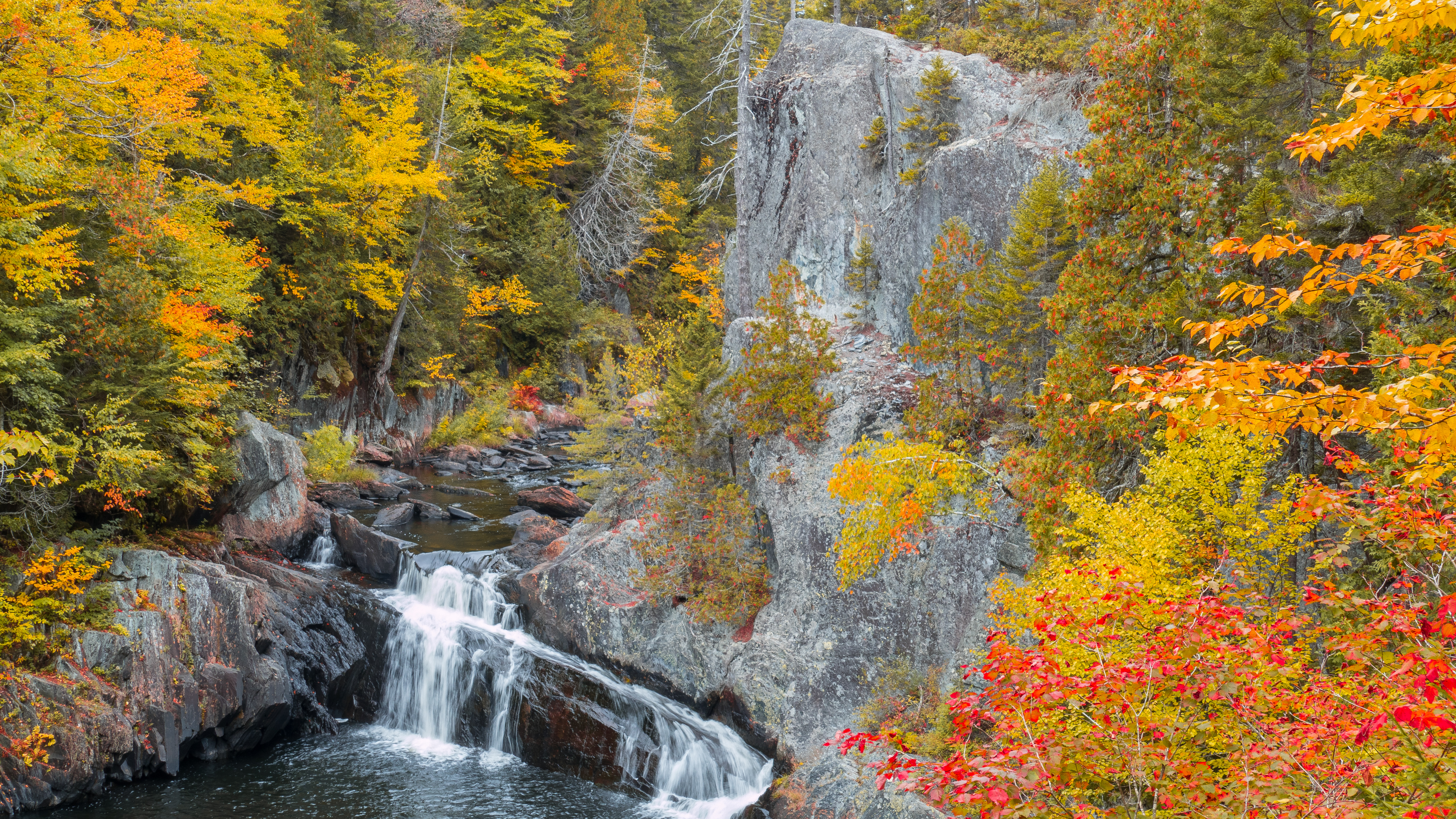
Fall foliage on the cliffs of Buttermilk Falls in Gulf Hagas, Maine.

Overall, 20% to 25% of Maine tourists come to the state to see the colorful displays of fall foliage in the Maine woods. Drought during the summer months and warmer temperature rates in the fall have affected when the leaves change color. Warmer temperatures have been delaying the start of the fall foliage change. Scientist Stephanie Spera has measured that the peak fall foliage date for Maine is now roughly 10 days later than it was in the 1950s.

=== Landlocked Arctic char ===
Maine has the southern most population of Arctic char, which was landlocked in deep, cold ponds after the glaciers retreated. The fish is rare and has adapted to different aquatic environments in Maine in different ways. Scientists who have studied the fish for 20 years report an increase in bird injuries among the fish.

=== Moose ===
Winter tick infestations of moose have risen due to the warming climate. Hunters and biologists often find adult moose with 40,000-90,000 ticks attached. In the 2021-2022 winter season, 86% of moose calves monitored in Piscataquis and Somerset Counties by the Maine Department of Inland Fisheries and Wildlife died from winter tick infestations.

== Agriculture ==
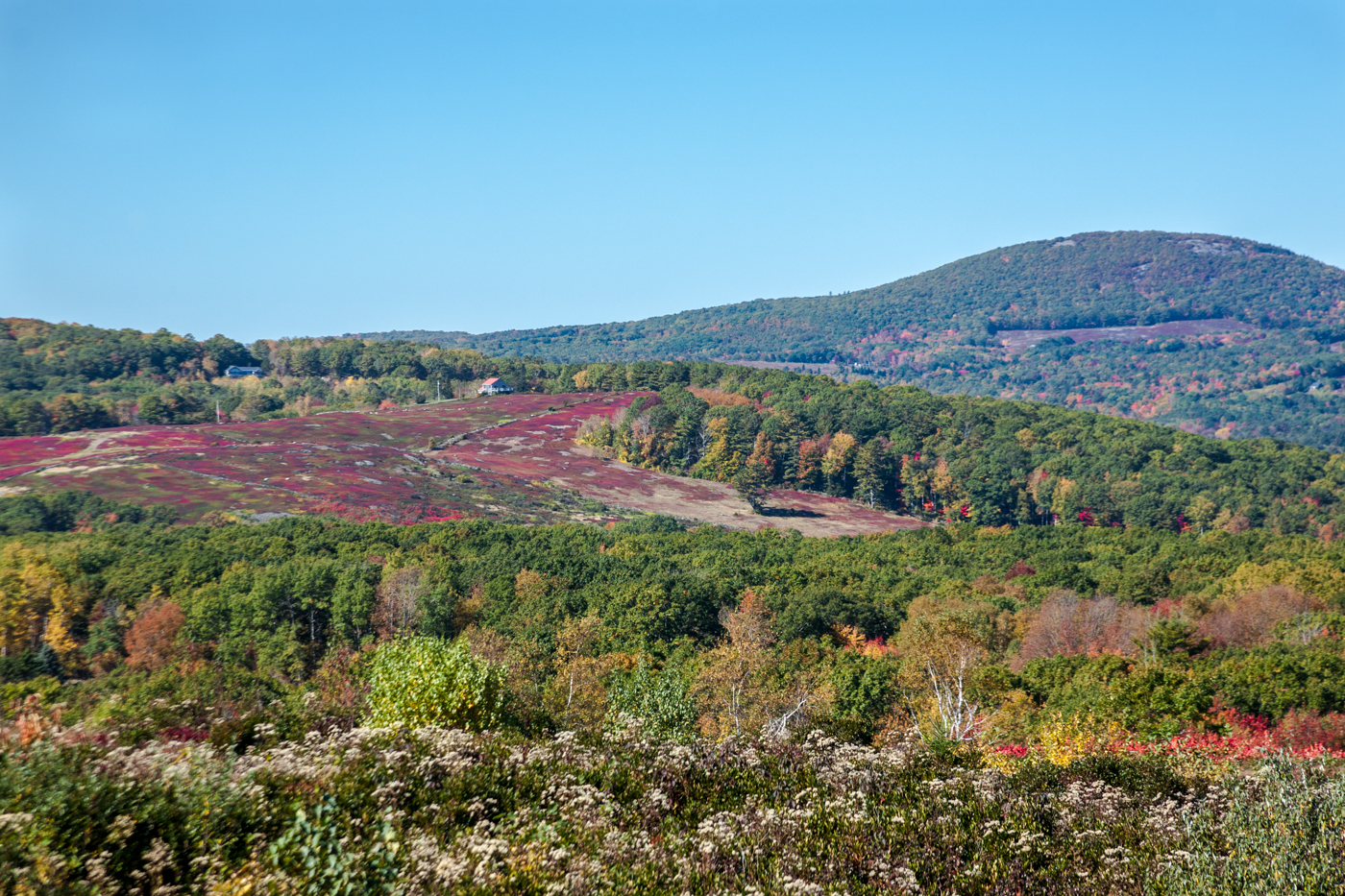
Maine blueberry barren.

Maine agriculture is impacted by the changing climate that includes more hot days, droughts, increased flooding, and longer growing season. Some crops and farms could benefit from a longer growing season and more carbon dioxide in the air that increases plant growth. The rising temperatures are affecting the maple sugar season.

=== Wild blueberries ===
The changing climate is affecting the wild blueberry crop. The most significant affect is to increase the crop yield due to the longer growing season. The crop yield tripled in a decade and state agricultural experts attributed it to the increased growing season.

=== Maple syrup ===
Because of the changing climate, maple sugaring season is shifting and causing maple syrup producers to adjust their methods. The season begins much sooner and stops intermittently because of unpredictable weather.

== Fishing industry ==
The fishing industry will suffer as ocean temperatures warm, which can lower oxygen levels, alter the ecosystem, and cause ocean acidity. More acidity harms lobsters and other shellfish. Some fish are moving northward as the waters warm.

== Winter recreation ==
According to the EPA "Warmer winters may bring more rain and less snow to Maine. A decline in snowfall would shorten the season during which the ground is covered with snow, which could harm recreational industries like skiing, snowboarding, and snowmobiling, and the local economies that depend on them".

== State policy ==
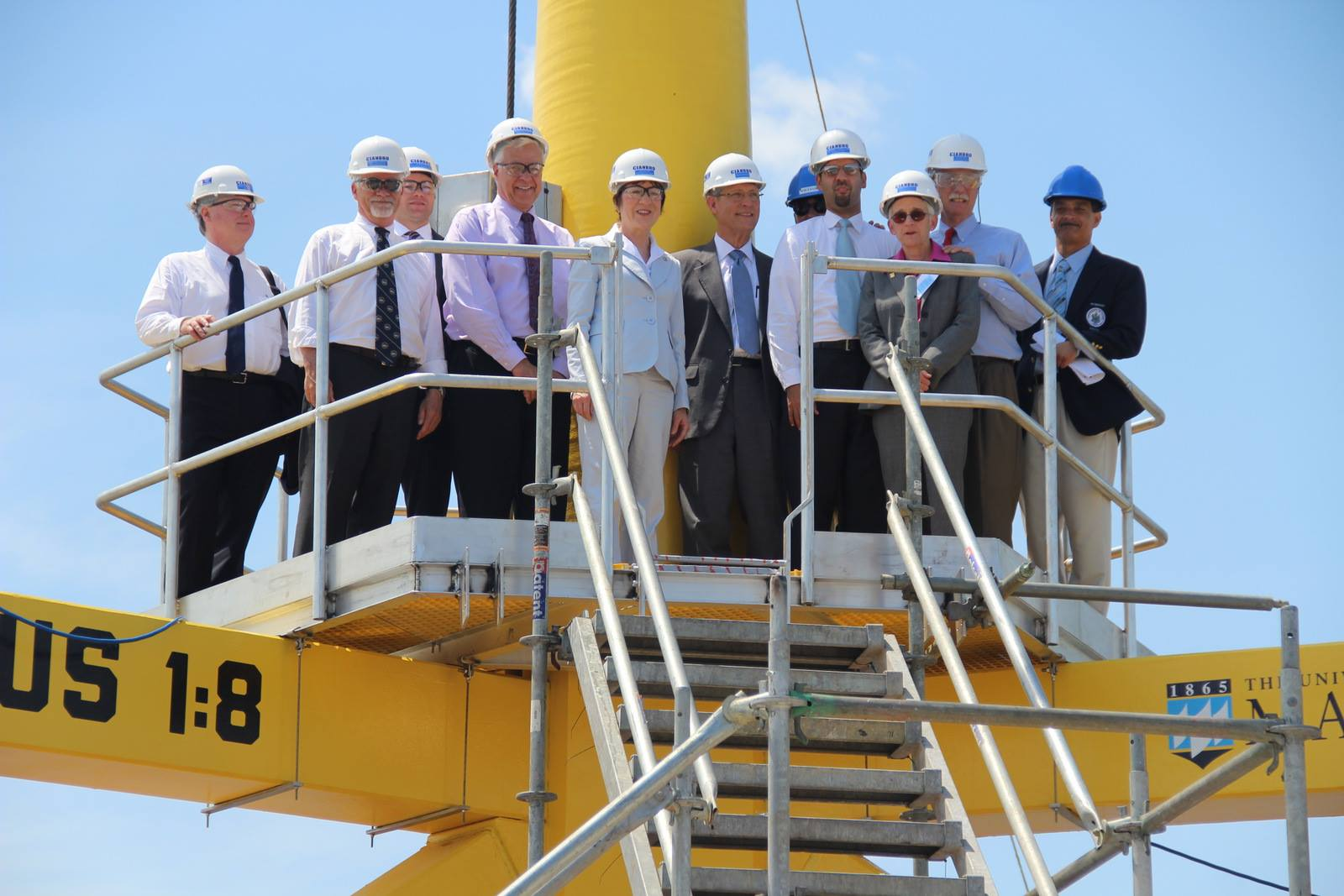
VolturnUS wind turbine launch, 2013

In December 2019, Maine joined consideration for a multi-state gasoline cap-and-trade program. The plan aims to reduce transportation-related tailpipe emissions, and would levy a tax on fuel companies based on carbon dioxide emissions. The most ambitious version of the plan is projected to reduce the area's tailpipe emissions by 25% between 2022 and 2032. The program is in the public comment phase, with individual states determining whether to participate. The program could begin as early as 2022.

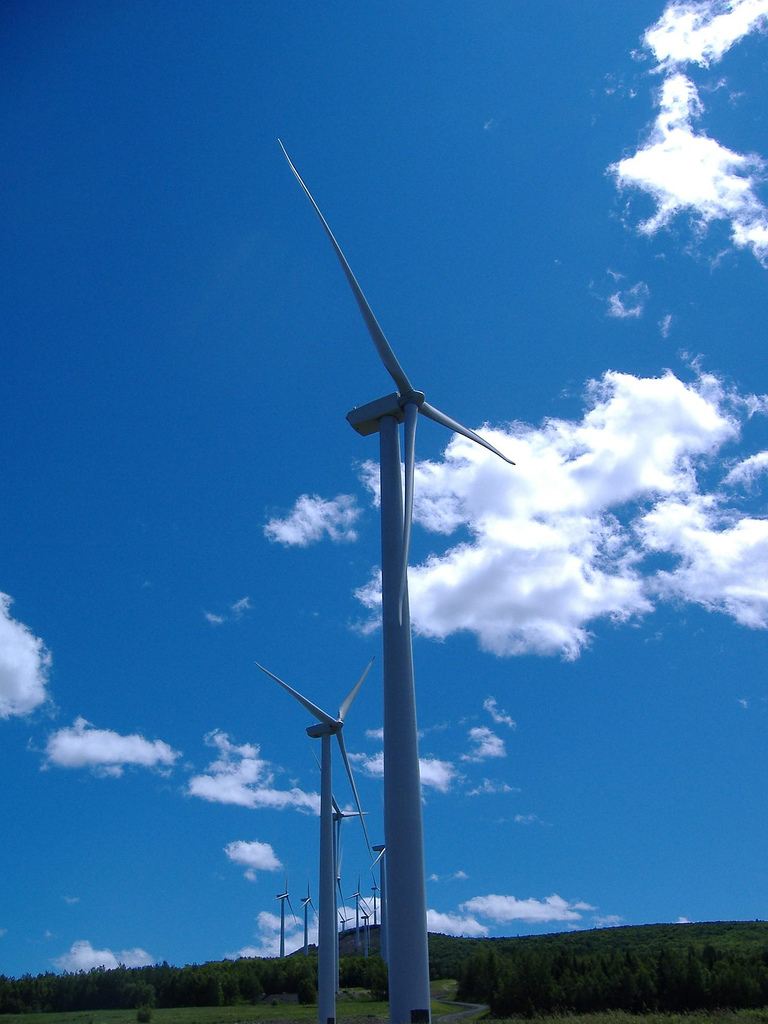
Mars Hill wind farm

In 2019, the Maine legislature created the Maine Climate Council. In 2020, the council issued a A Four-Year Plan for Climate Action. The plan outlines actions in four areas: Reducing Greenhouse Gas Emissions, Avoiding the Impacts and Costs of Inaction, Fostering Economic Opportunity and Prosperity, and Advancing Equity through Maine's Climate Response.

In 2023, Maine Governor Janet Mills was elected co-chair of the bipartisan Climate Alliance.

=== Energy policy ===
The Maine legislature and Governor Janet Mills passed legislation in 2019 making community solar farms financially feasible for energy companies and as a result between 2021 and 2023 the solar capacity in Maine increased 300%.

In 2019, Governor Mills set a goal of installing 100,000 heat pumps by 2025. In 2023, the state reached this goal with 104,000 heat pumps installed. Governor Mills then announced a new goal of installing 175,000 more heat pumps by 2027. By 2023, Kennebec Valley Community College had trained 558 heat pump installation technicians who earned between $25 and $30 an hour.

Maine's climate action plan calls for getting 219,000 electric vehicles on Maine roads by 2030. In 2023, only about 9,500 electric vehicles were registered in Maine. According to Forbes Advisor, Maine ranks number 4 nationally on its list of the electric vehicle charger access based on the ratio of electric vehicles to vehicle charging stations in the state.

=== Maine Climate Office ===
The Maine Climate Office is a joint venture of the Climate Change Institute and the University of Maine Cooperative Extension. It supplies current and historical climate and weather data along with temperature and precipitation data and ocean temperature data.

== University of Maine Climate Change Institute ==
The University of Maine Climate Change Institute has made numerous scientific discoveries, including mapping the difference between climate during the Last Glacial Period and during modern times, connecting acid rain to human causes in the 1980s, and finding that the climate can change abruptly through analysis of ice core samples from Greenland.

Maine State Climatologist Sean Birkel created the Climate Reanalyzer, a computer model based on data from the National Oceanic and Atmospheric Administration satellites and the National Weather Service's Centers for Environmental Prediction, and maintained by the Climate Change Institute. Its data is often cited in news reports. The project makes available online visualizations of daily mean sea surface temperatures, daily average global temperatures, and daily sea ice.

Between March and April 2023, the Climate Reanalyzer showed ocean temperatures were at their highest in 40 years. On July 4, 2023, the Climate Reanalyzer reported the hottest day on Earth ever recorded when the global average temperature measured 17.18 degrees Celsius (62.92 degrees Fahrenheit). The following day, July 5, 2023, the recorded global average temperature rose 0.17 degrees Celsius (0.31 degrees Fahrenheit) from the previous day's record heat.

== Maine Climate Hub ==
In 2023, the Maine Environmental Education Association and the national Subject to Climate created the online Maine Climate Hub. It is a database of lesson plans and resources for all subjects and grade levels that have been approved by scientists.

== Citizen & business response ==
Maine residents have been taking individual and collective actions to mitigate the effects of climate change.

=== Local grain economy ===
Maine farmers and businesses have been working to rebuild Maine's grain farming industry and one reason is to be more resilient to global food disruptions, including those caused by climate change. Rebuilding local grain farming is an economic issue but also a food security issue since a regional grain economy protects local consumers from national and international grain supply disruptions linked to climate change. Maine's grain economy provided a buffer against supply disruptions caused by the COVID-19 pandemic and its local farmers and mills continued to supply Maine stores when national brands of flour were no longer available.

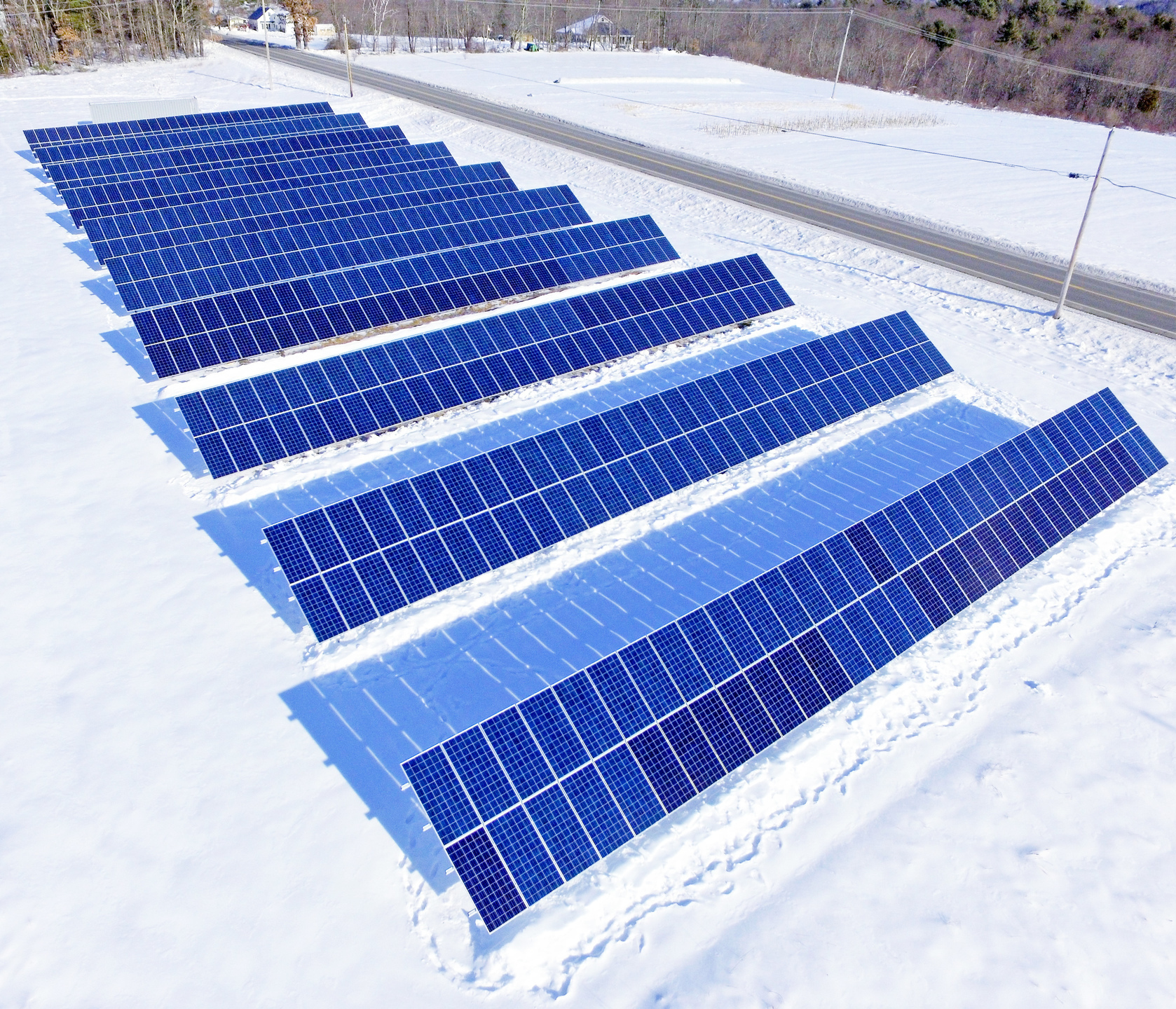
A community solar farm

=== Reducing emissions ===
The three Maine factories operated by New Balance aim to be net zero by 2050 by using solar power. A single pair of running shoes produces 30 pounds of carbon dioxide emissions according to a lifecycle assessment performed by the Massachusetts Institute of Technology. A former dairy farm in Farmington installed 300,000 solar panels generating 76.5 megawatts of power on 300 acres. It is believed to be the largest solar farm in New England. Volunteers and community groups create window inserts to reduce drafts in Maine's large number of old homes as part of the WindowDressers program. In 2023, the University of Southern Maine in Portland opened the state's largest Level Two charging station with 58 chargers and the largest indoor bicycle storage facility with room for more than 250 bikes in a new parking garage.

=== Watershed restoration ===
The Houlton Band of Maliseet Indians is working to restore the watershed of the Meduxnekeag River, which was damaged by logging drives, and bring back the native Atlantic salmon. The restoration aims to slow the flow of the river and cool its overheated waters, both of which are increasing with climate change. The river is located in Aroostook County and lacks the structure and complexity that it used to have that allowed salmon and other fish to live in the river.

=== Flexitarian diets ===
The consumption of meat and dairy products makes up more than 14% of global greenhouse gas emissions and in response a social movement is developing in Maine with a growing number of Maine people using vegan, vegetarian, and flexitarian diets to reduce those emissions. Maine Sunday Telegram vegan columnist Avery Yale Kamila said going vegetarian is too difficult for most people. Instead, Kamila said it is more doable for all people to reduce meat and dairy consumption. Professor Doreen Stabinsky of the College of the Atlantic published a report in 2018 that suggested that humans must have a 50% reduction in animal-based foods to avoid the worst effects of climate change.

== Climate migration destination ==
Maine is viewed as a potential destination for people fleeing climate disasters, known as climate migrants. During the COVID-19 pandemic, more than 34,000 people moved to Maine and researchers speculate that climate disasters could drive similar migrations to Maine. In 2022, Maine's population increased at twice the national average, driven by in-migration. This represented a change from 1980 to 2020, when Maine's population increased at a slower rate than the national average.

== See also ==
- List of U.S. states and territories by carbon dioxide emissions
- Plug-in electric vehicles in Maine
