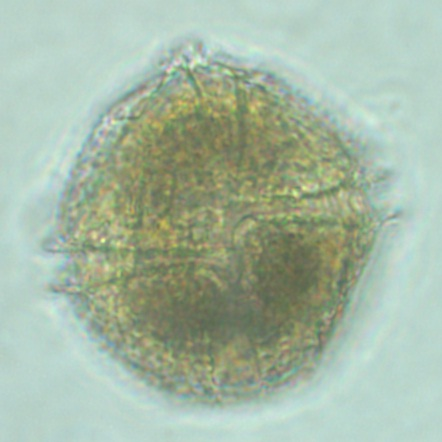
- Ventral view of Lingulodinium polyedrum 900x magnification

Scientific classification
- Domain: Eukaryota
- Clade: Diaphoretickes
- Clade: SAR
- Clade: Alveolata
- Phylum: Myzozoa
- Superclass: Dinoflagellata
- Class: Dinophyceae
- Order: Gonyaulacales
- Family: Lingulodiniaceae
- Genus: Lingulodinium
- Species: L. polyedra

Binomial name
- Lingulodinium polyedra Dodge

= Lingulodinium polyedra =

Species of single-celled organism

Lingulodinium polyedra is a species of motile photosynthetic dinoflagellates. L. polyedra are often the cause of red tides in southern California, leading to bioluminescent displays on beaches at night.

== Life cycle ==
As part of its life cycle, this species produces a resting stage, a dinoflagellate cyst called Lingulodinium machaerophorum (synonym Hystrichosphaeridium machaerophorum). This cyst was first described by Deflandre and Cookson in 1955 from the Miocene of Balcombe Bay, Victoria, Australia as: "Shell globular, subsphaerical or ellipsoidal with a rigid membrane, more brittle than deformable, covered with numerous long, stiff, conical, pointed processes resembling the blade of a dagger. Surface of shell granular or punctate." Its stratigraphic range is the Upper Paleocene of eastern USA and Denmark till Recent.

Organic-walled dinocyst morphology is shown to be controlled by changes in salinity and temperature in some species, more particularly process length variation (processes are sometimes called spines, but that is incorrect because they are not necessarily pointy). This morphological variation is known for Lingulodinium machaerophorum from culture experiments, and study of surface sediments. The morphological variation of process lengths can be applied for the reconstruction of salinity. Process length variation of Lingulodinium machaerophorum has been used to reconstruct Black Sea salinity variation.

== Toxicity ==
Lingulodinium polyedra has been related to production of yessotoxins (YTXs), a group of structurally related polyether toxins, which can accumulate in shellfish.

== Luminescence ==
Bioluminescence off Solana Beach, California, April 2020

Lingulodinium polyedra are easily visible under 100x magnification (use the 10x or "scanning" objective on most compound microscopes) and their scintillons luminescence in response to surface tension and acidity. Luminescence is under circadian regulation, peaking at night. Because of this obvious rhythms (and also due to the fact that most its activities, physiological and molecular, are rhythmic) L. polyedra has been a model organism for studying clocks in single cells.

== Gallery ==
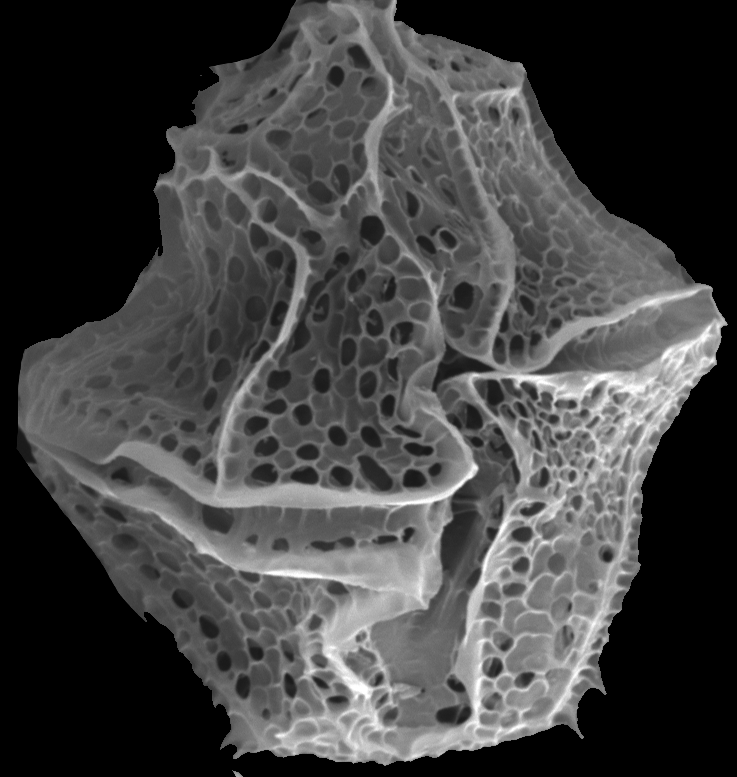
Ventral view of Lingulodinium polyedra as observed by a scanning electron microscope. Cell diameter is roughly 40 micrometers.

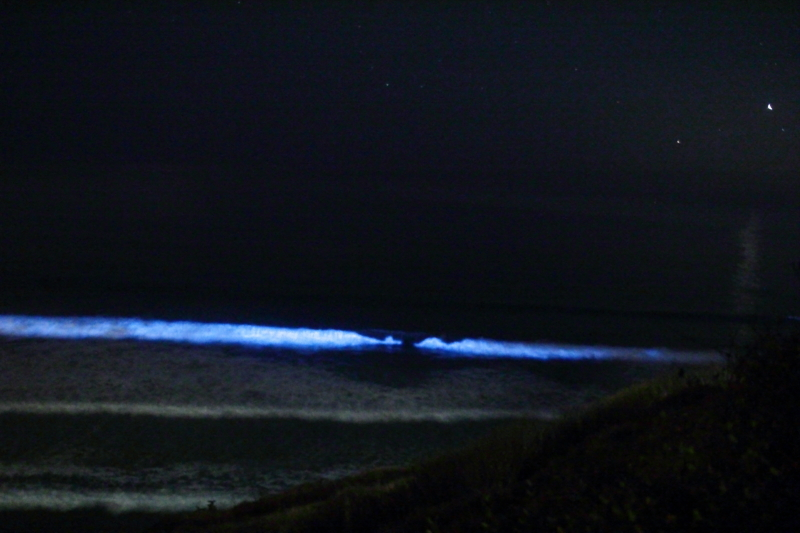
L. polyedra Bioluminescing at Scripps Institution of Oceanography on September 29, 2011 (exposure: 1 sec / F2.8 / ISO 6400)

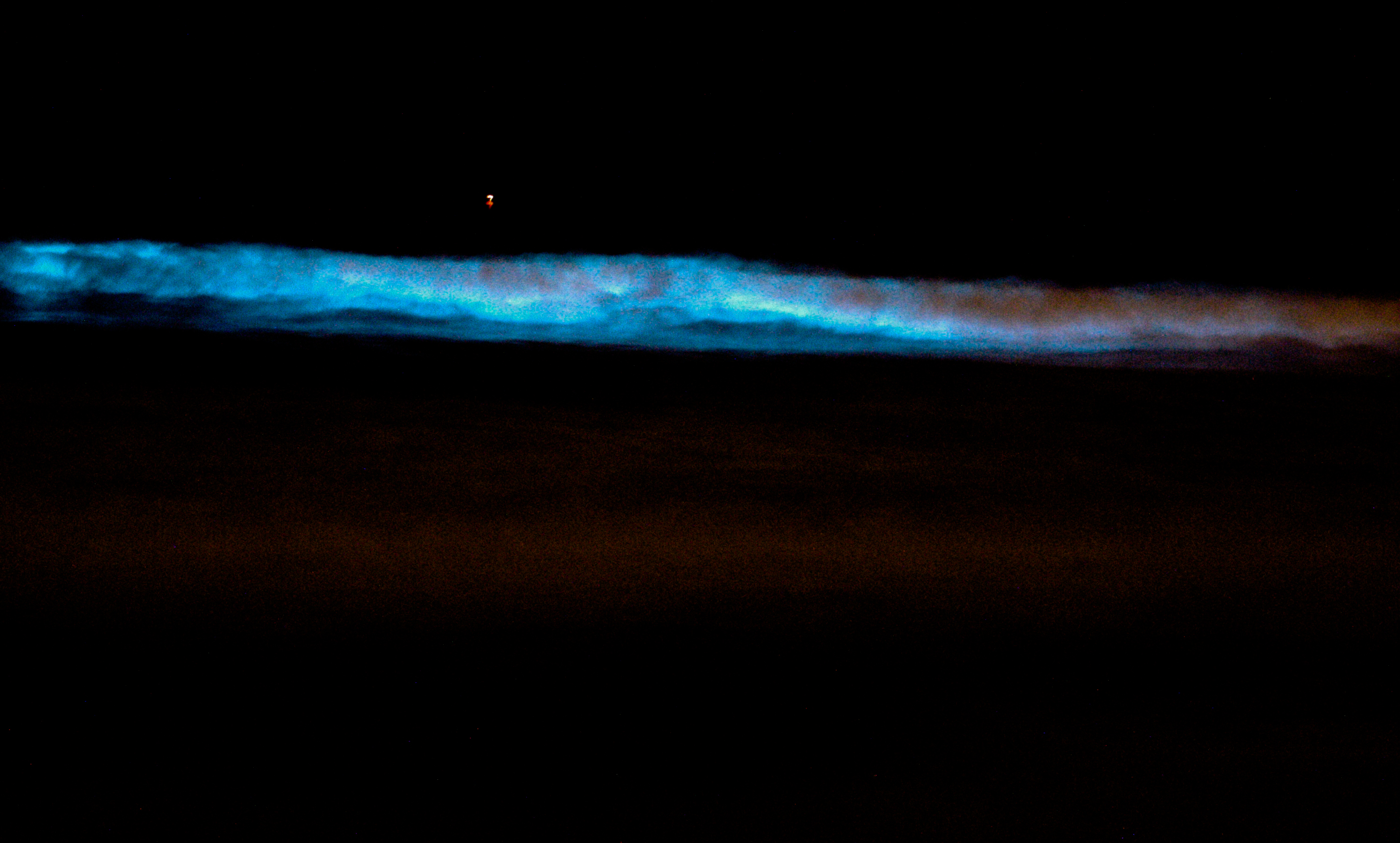
L. polyedra in the surf off Solana Beach, California on 25 September 2011. (Exposure: 3 sec / f4 / ISO 3200 / f 210 mm)
