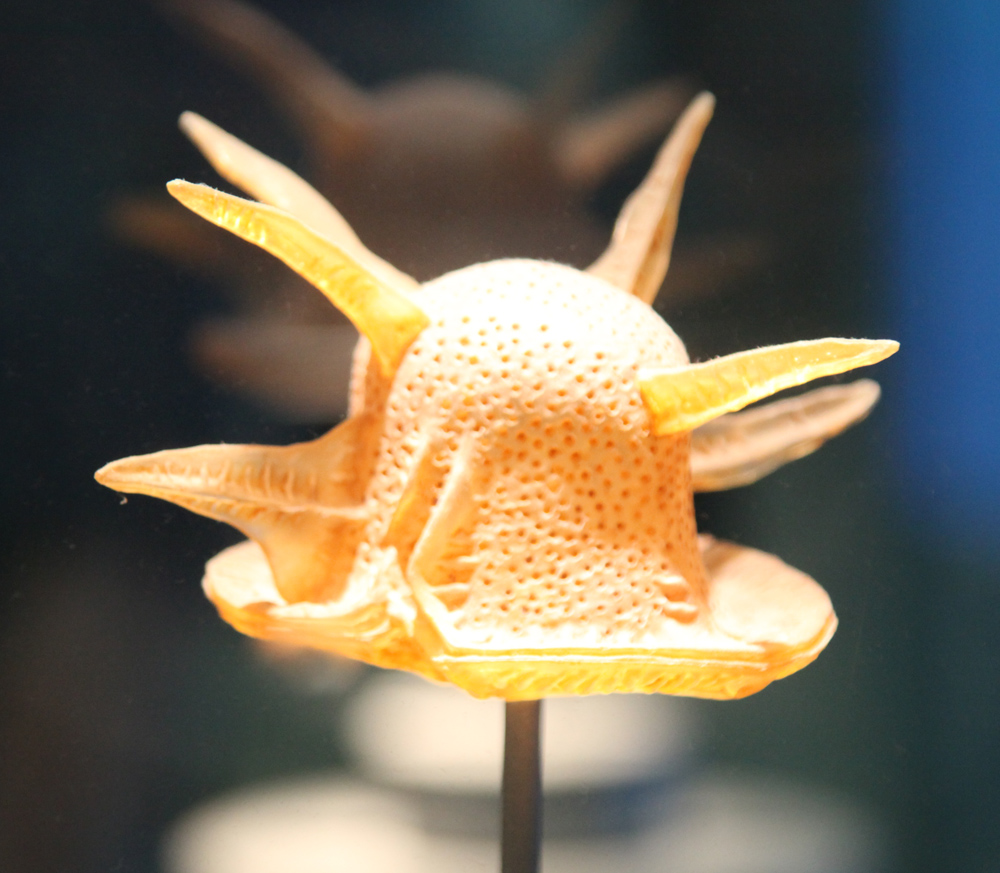

Scientific classification
- Domain: Eukaryota
- Clade: Diaphoretickes
- Clade: SAR
- Clade: Alveolata
- Phylum: Myzozoa
- Superclass: Dinoflagellata
- Class: Dinophyceae
- Order: Gonyaulacales
- Family: Ceratocoryaceae
- Genus: Ceratocorys
- Species: C. horrida

Binomial name
- Ceratocorys horrida F.Stein, 1883

= Ceratocorys horrida =

Species of single-celled organism

Ceratocorys horrida is a species of dinoflagellate. The species was first listed by F. Stein in 1883. The body may be round in shape, or angular. The species has spines emanating from its body which may vary in length, which has resulted in the species described in various forms. C. horrida is widespread around the globe, found in temperate to tropical ocean waters in the Neritic zone. It is among the dominant species in the Humboldt Current.
