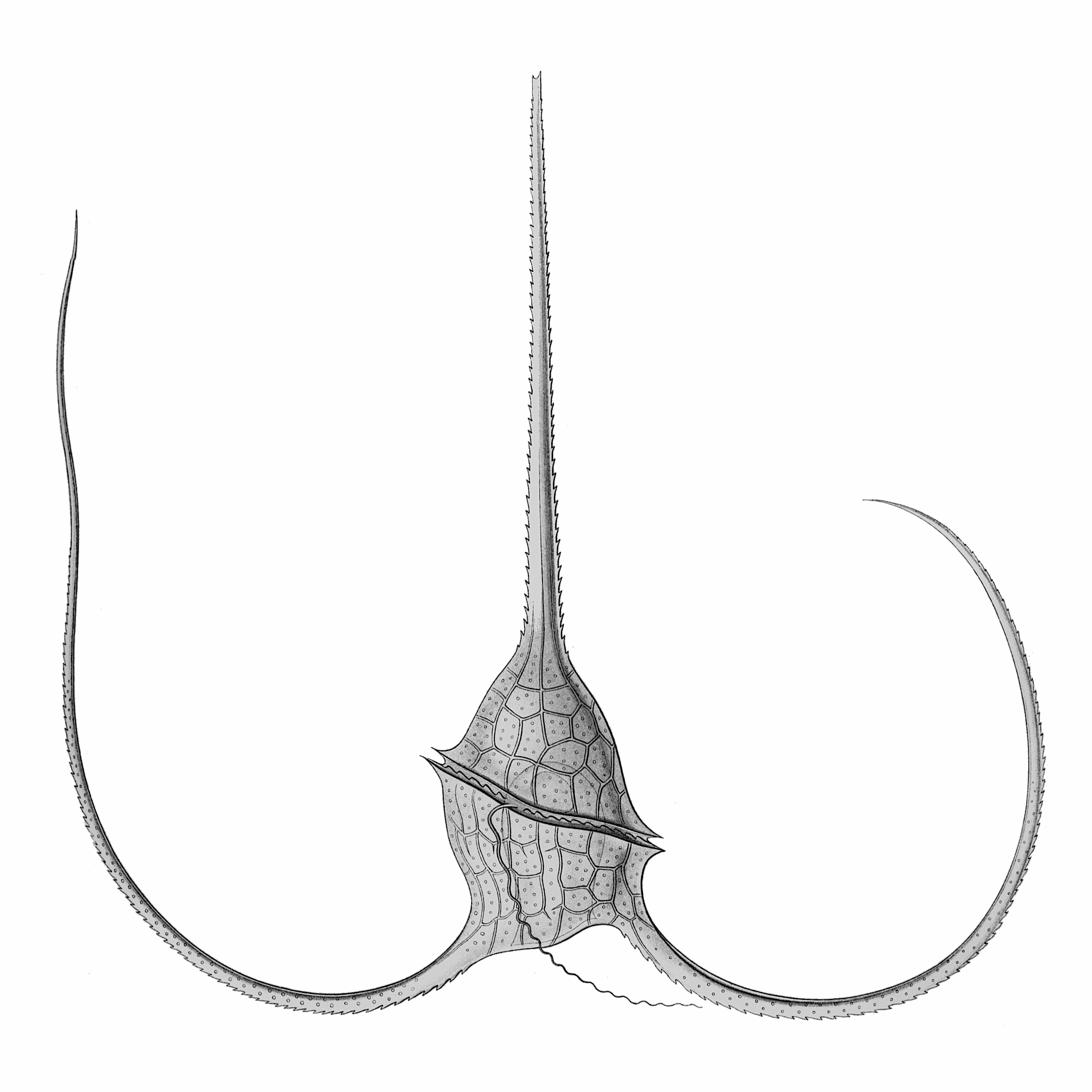

Scientific classification
- Domain: Eukaryota
- Clade: Diaphoretickes
- Clade: Sar
- Clade: Alveolata
- Phylum: Myzozoa
- Superclass: Dinoflagellata
- Class: Dinophyceae
- Order: Gonyaulacales
- Family: Ceratiaceae
- Genus: Tripos
- Species: T. muelleri

Binomial name
- Tripos muelleri Bory

Synonyms
- Ceratium tripos (O.F.Müller) Nitzsch; Neoceratium tripos (O.F.Müller) F.Gómez, D.Moreira & P.López-Garcia

= Tripos muelleri =

Species of single-celled organism

Tripos muelleri is a species of dinoflagellates of the genus Tripos.

== Anatomy ==
This chromist is easy to recognize and identify among all the phytoplankton, because of its three horns in a pitchfork arrangement. The horn in the middle is called the apical horn, and it is used as a flagellum. The other two horns are called lateral horns, and they are solely used as an aid for flotation.

== Habitat ==
This species lives along all the phytoplankton on the ocean surface worldwide, where it is one of the dominant species. Despite this, it is usually solitary, although during reproduction season, several individuals may congregate, all of their apical horns join. This occurs when a cell divides, so that the daughter cells remain together, linked in short chains. This particular species may sometimes be parasitized by other chromists or protists.

== History ==
Tripos species were originally classified under the genus Ceratium, however they were reclassified to the new genus Neoceratium in 2009 following a ribosomal RNA sequencing study. However, since the name Neoceratium was preceded by an older name Tripos, all names were transferred to Tripos.
