= Amylax =

Scientific classification
- Domain: Eukaryota
- Clade: Diaphoretickes
- Clade: Sar
- Clade: Alveolata
- Phylum: Myzozoa
- Superclass: Dinoflagellata
- Class: Dinophyceae
- Order: Gonyaulacales
- Family: Lingulodiniaceae
- Genus: Amylax; A.Meunier

Genus of protists

Amylax is a genus of dinoflagellates belonging to the family Lingulodiniaceae.

Species:

- Amylax buxus (Balech) J.D.Dodge
- Amylax catenata (Levander) Meunier
- Amylax diacantha Meunier
