= Ceratophorus =

Scientific classification
- Domain: Eukaryota
- Clade: Diaphoretickes
- Clade: SAR
- Clade: Alveolata
- Phylum: Myzozoa
- Superclass: Dinoflagellata
- Class: Dinophyceae
- Order: Gonyaulacales
- Family: Ceratiaceae
- Genus: Ceratophorus; Diesing, 1850

Genus of single-celled organisms

Ceratophorus is a genus of dinoflagellates.
