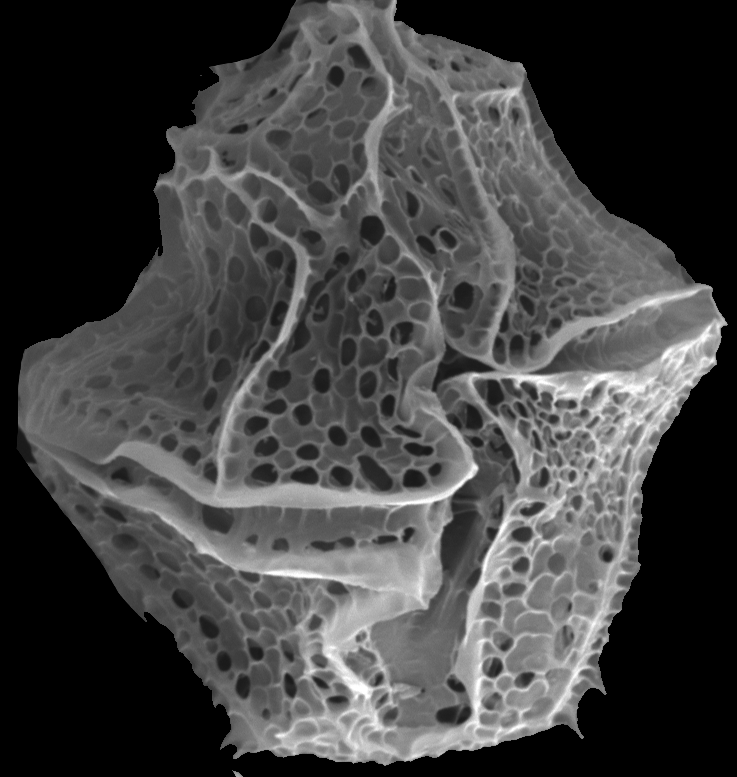
- This electron micrograph shows the complex pattern of plates forming the theca. Also seen are two grooves, one horizontal and one vertical, in which the flagella would normally lie.

Scientific classification
- Domain: Eukaryota
- Clade: Sar
- Clade: Alveolata
- Phylum: Dinoflagellata
- Class: Dinophyceae
- Order: Gonyaulacales
- Family: Lingulodiniaceae
- Genus: Lingulodinium; D.Wall

= Lingulodinium =

Genus of protists

Lingulodinium is a genus of dinoflagellates belonging to the family Gonyaulacaceae.

The genus has cosmopolitan distribution.

Species:

- Lingulodinium hemicystum McMinn
- Lingulodinium polyedra (F.Stein) J.D.Dodge
