= Tripos (disambiguation) =

Tripos may refer to:

- Tripos, a course system at the University of Cambridge
- TRIPOS, a computer operating system
- Tripos (dinoflagellate), a genus of marine organisms in the family Ceratiaceae
- Tripos, in mathematics, a higher-order fibration over the category Set for which the products and coproducts induced by functions satisfy the Beck-Chevalley condition.
