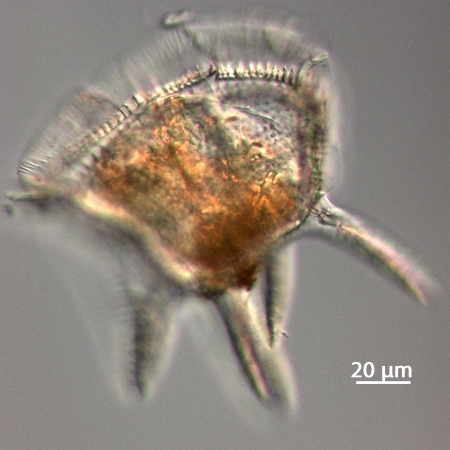
- Ceratocorys horrida

Scientific classification
- Domain: Eukaryota
- Clade: Sar
- Clade: Alveolata
- Division: Dinoflagellata
- Class: Dinophyceae
- Order: Gonyaulacales
- Family: Ceratocoryaceae; Lindemann, 1928
- Genus: Ceratocorys; F.Stein, 1883

Species
- Ceratocorys anacantha Ceratocorys armata Ceratocorys aultii Ceratocorys bipes Ceratocorys gourretii Ceratocorys grahamii Ceratocorys horrida Ceratocorys indica Ceratocorys kofoidii Ceratocorys magna Ceratocorys reticulata Ceratocorys skogsbergii

= Ceratocorys =

Genus of single-celled organisms

Ceratocorys is a genus of photosynthetic free-living marine dinoflagellates first described in 1883 by Friedrich Stein. Currently consisting of 12 species, this genus is typically found at the water surface in tropical and subtropical ocean regions, and has both low nutrient requirements and salinity sensitivity. All species in the genus have a theca; 29 membrane-bound armored plates with anywhere from 2 to 6 spines protruding from the cell. They reproduce through binary fission at temperatures above 20 °C during asexual reproduction and whether or not they have sexual reproduction is not known. Due to its bioluminescent capabilities, the type species of this genus, Ceratocorys horrida, has many practical applications. Its bioluminescent response to water flow means it can act as a model organism for understanding planktonic reaction to water movement. It is also sensitive to environmental molecules; by measuring the bioluminescent response it can be used in rapid toxicity tests to detect the levels of different contaminants in water systems. Its presence is also an indicator of different oceanic phenomena like upwellings or tropical waters.

== Etymology ==
Etymology not provided in the original description.

== Type species ==
Ceratocorys horrida

== History ==
The type species of Ceratocorys (C. horrida) was first described by Friedrich Stein in 1883 in the third volume of Der Organismus der Infusionsthiere. The specimens were found in the Kvarner Gulf in Croatia, part of the Pacific Ocean. The next species to be described, currently accepted as C. bipes, was first described in 1903 by P. T. Cleves as Goniodoma bipes but was then renamed to its currently taxonomically accepted name by C. A. Kofoid in 1910. In the same year, C. A. Kofoid also described C. armata (previously known as Goniodoma acuminatum var. armata, described by F. Schütt in 1895) and C. magna. O. Paulsen described C. kofoidii in 1931 and C. gourretii in 1937. In 1941, H. W. Graham described three species: C. aultii, C. reticulata, and C. skogsbergii. C. indica was described by E. J. F. Wood in 1963. C. acantha and C. grahamii were described by M. C. Carbonell-Moore in 1996. All of this information was summarized by F. Gomez in 2005 in "A list of free-living dinoflagellates in the world's oceans". The most recently taxonomically accepted described species in this genus is C. malayensis, described by Z. Luo, P. T. Lim, and H. Gu in 2019.

Many "new species" of Ceratocorys described throughout history have simply been a mislabelling of daughter cells of known species that had not yet fully developed their horns (reproduction will be elaborated on in the organismal description section). As an example, Matzenauer in 1933 described a "new species" of Ceratocorys that he called C. hirsuta, but the figures drawn very closely resembled a C. horrida cell lacking two of its spines.

== Habitat and ecology ==
The organisms in this genus are all marine species and live in tropical and subtropical ocean regions. Like other dinoflagellates, this genus favours intermediate salinity,. though organisms within it are found in such a wide range of salinities that this genus likely has low sensitivity to salinity levels. They are also considered oligotrophic organisms with low nutrient requirements, having been found in regions where the phosphate content of the water was <10 mg/m^{3}. While most dinoflagellates are mixotrophic, so far it seems that Ceratocorys are autotrophic. Since these organisms are photosynthetic and require sunlight to make food, they are most often found at the surface of the water

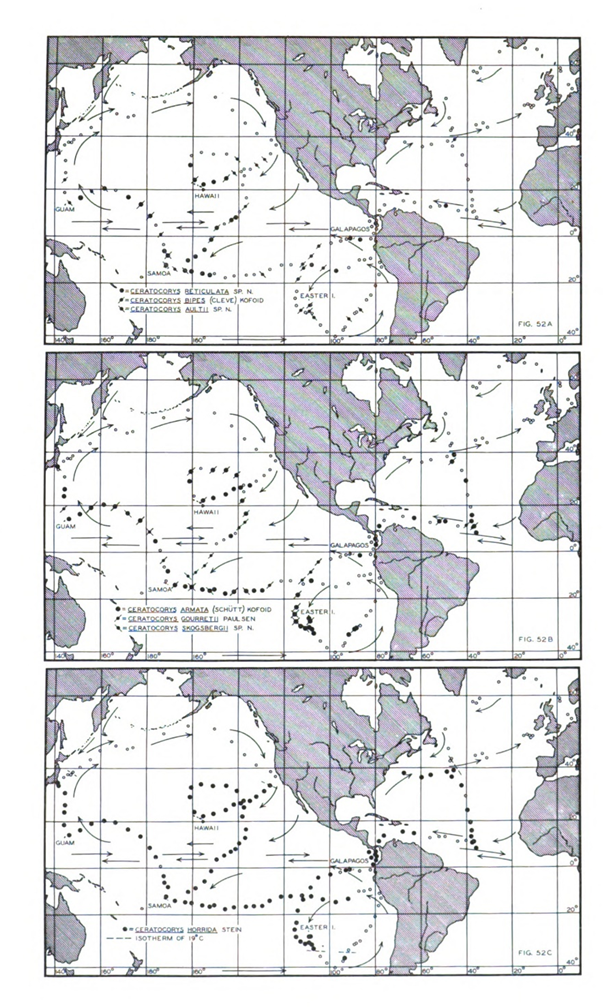
Figure 52 referenced in-text. Illustration of ecological range of various Ceratocorys species.

The type species C. horrida is very widespread, having been found in the Atlantic, Pacific, Mediterranean, Indian, Red, and Arabian Oceans. It is found in both hemispheres nearly entirely year-round. The distribution limits of this species are sharply marked by the 19 °C isotherm, rarely ever appearing where the surface temperature is below 19 °C (Fig. 52C).

C. armata likely has a similar range to that of C. horrida, though is slightly more limited to warm water, and is also rarer (Fig. 52B).

C. reticulata is a distinctly tropical species and is even more limited to higher temperatures than C. horrida or C. armata (Fig. 52A).

C. aultii is also a tropical species but is rare and has a sparse population. It has not been found anywhere where the water surface temperature is below 19 °C and it is also possible that, unlike the other species in this genus that live near the surface of the water, it may be more abundant below 100m (Fig. 52A).

C. bipes, like C. aultii, is a rare tropical species, and is much more restricted to warm tropical water than any other species in the genus, having never been found at any area where the surface temperature was lower than 20 °C (Fig. 52A).

C. gourretii is a widespread but rare tropical species, even more restricted to warm waters than C. bipes and having never been found anywhere with surface temperature lower than 22.3 °C (Fig. 52B).

C. skogsbergii is found in the southwestern Pacific, but is such a rare tropical species that no significant distributional correlation can be made (Fig. 52B).

Wood describes C. indica as being distributed in the East Indian Ocean. When first described, C. acantha was found in the Caribbean Sea.

C. malayensis has been found in Malaysian waters.

Due to the nearly ubiquitous presence of Ceratocorys in the oceans, it is ecologically important as a primary producer, though what organisms it specifically interacts with is not well known. As a fully autotrophic organism it does not prey on any other species and is instead preyed on by heterotrophic organisms. It is also hypothesized that the bioluminescent capability of C. horrida is a defense mechanism against predation, acting either to startle the predator from feeding or to alert an even higher-level predator of its presence.

== Description ==
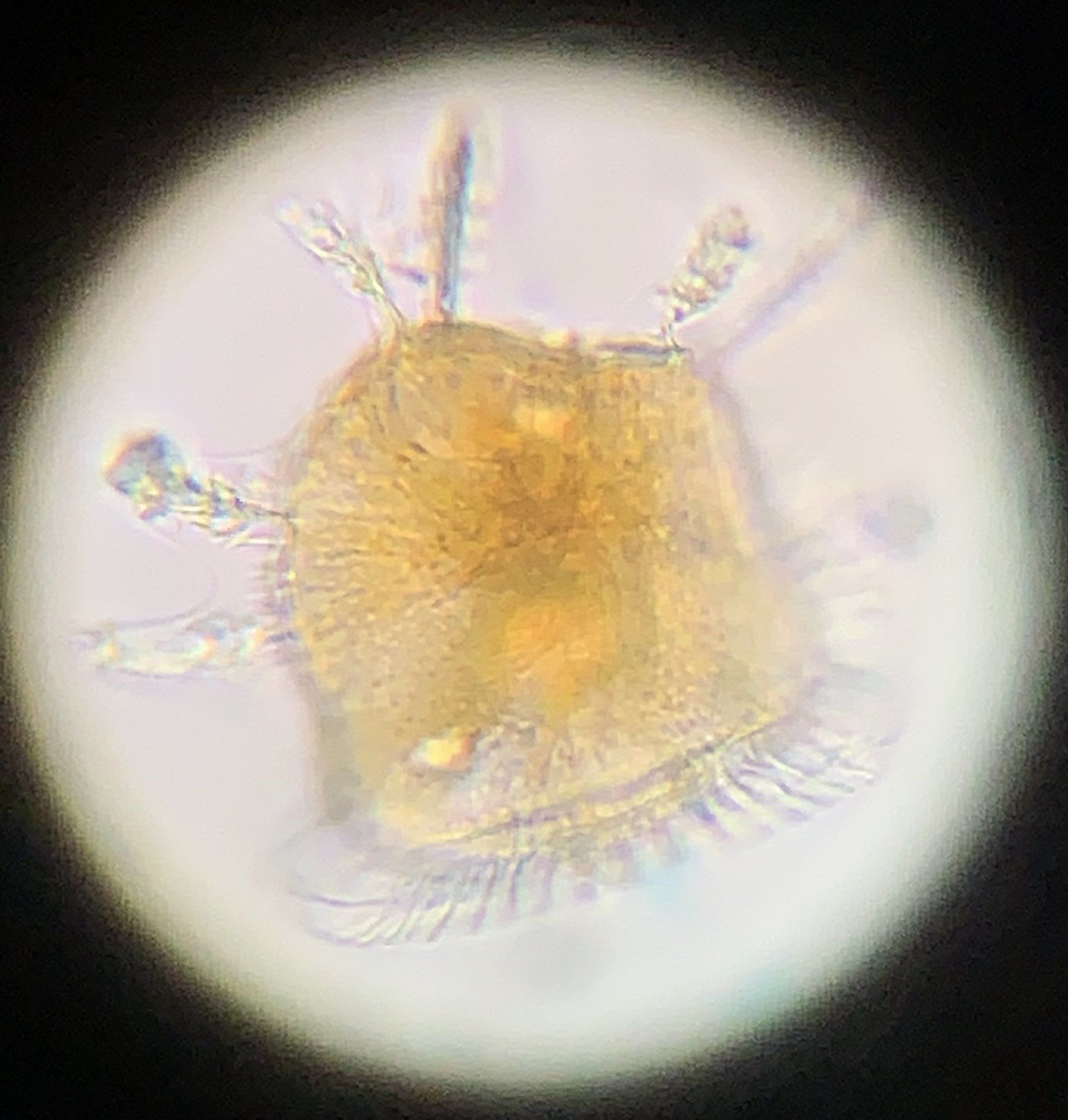
Light microscope view of Ceratocorys horrida

Ceratocorys, as a genus of dinoflagellate eukaryotic autotrophic organisms, contains all the organelles one would expect to find; a dinokaryon, smooth and rough endoplasmic reticulum, vacuoles, chloroplasts, and golgi bodies, as well as other specialized organelles.

=== Bioluminescence ===
Many dinoflagellates are bioluminescent, and Ceratocorys is no exception, emitting a blue-green light. Dinoflagellates are also the only known photosynthetic organisms with bioluminescent capabilities. The gene responsible for this bioluminescence in dinoflagellates is known as the dinoflagellate luciferase gene (lcf). C. horrida produces bioluminescence when exposed to shear stress in water, caused by things such as waves or wind at the water surface. The light is produced in specialized organelles known as scintillions which contain both the substrate luciferin and the enzyme luciferase. When the cell is agitated, a series of reactions leads to a decrease in pH in the scintillion organelles, changing the luciferase conformation and allowing it to bind to luciferin, which causes the flash of light.

=== Morphology ===
There is quite some variation of size and shape between species in this genus. Cell length varies from 38μm in C. gourretti to 99μm in C. armata. Measurements in C. horrida are 38-97μm lengthwise and a diameter of 43-92μm at the girdle. Cell girdle width for these same species varies from 28μm to 114μm respectively. All members of this genus are angular in shape with the exception of C. gouretti, with C. horrida being the most angular. Girdle placement also varies between species; it is almost equatorialin C. armata and C. reticulata and is more anteriorly positioned in other species, furthest anterior in C. horrida and C. gouretti.

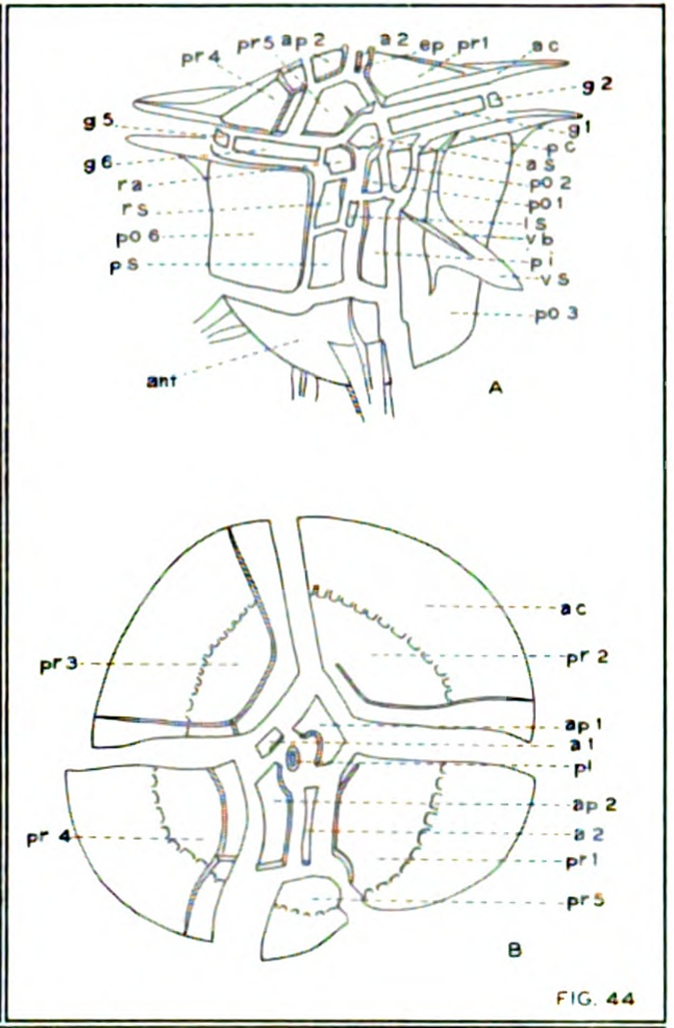
Figure 44 referenced in-text. Illustration of Ceratocorys horrida thecal plating.

Thecal plate patterning of the Ceratocorys genus is extremely consistent between species. There is a total of 29 plates; 10 epithecal plates (5 apical plates, 5 postcingular plates), 6 girdle plates, 5 ventral sulcal plates, 8 hypothecal plates (6 postcingular plates, 1 antapical plate, and 1 posterior intercalary plate).

The anterior apical pore is covered by an apical closing platelet not attached to any other plate. A total of 4 plates are in the apical region but only 2 touch the apical closing platelet are considered apical plates. These are called the first and second apical plates, which surround the left-dorsal and right-ventral edges of the pore respectively. The other two are called the first and second anterior intercalary plates, the first of which is a small square plate between the first and second apical plates, and the second of which bears the ventral epithecal pore (Fig. 44B).

The 5 postcingular plates surround the 5 apical plates and are counted one through five counterclockwise from the bottom right. The fifth plate is smaller than the first four posterior to second anterior intercalary and second apical plates (Fig. 44B).

The 6 girdle plates are of approximately equal length (Fig. 44A).

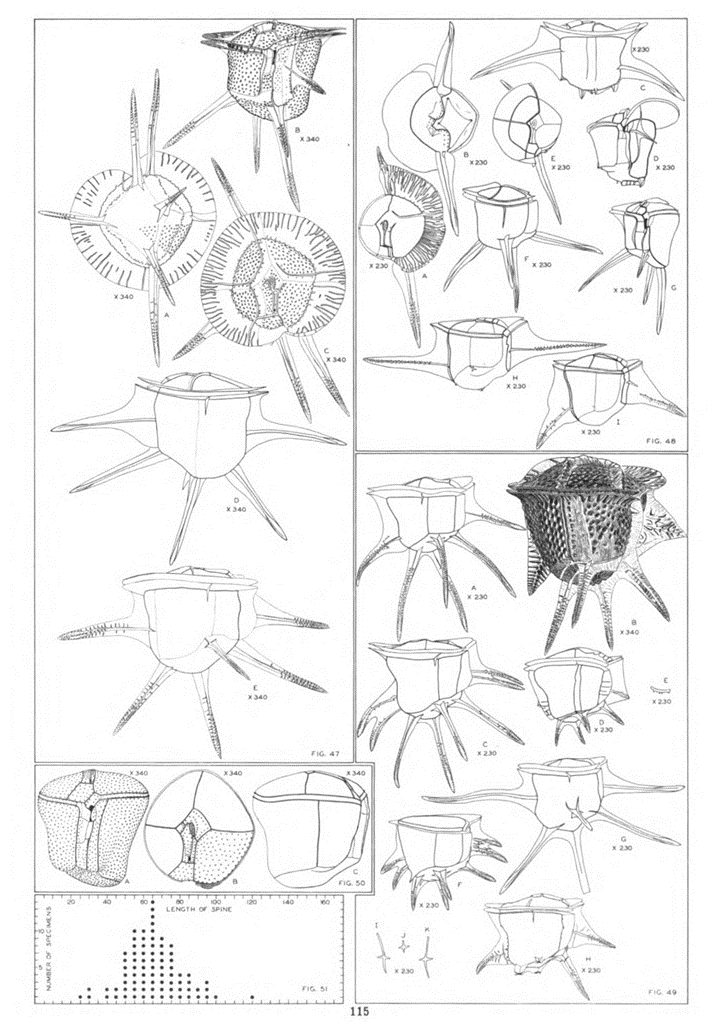
Figures 47-51 referenced in-text. Illustrations of Ceratocorys horrida from different perspectives

5 sulcal plates make up the ventral area surrounding the flagellar pore. The smallest of the sulcal plates of the cell is the rectangular posterior sulcal plate. Anterior to this is the left sulcal plate that forms the posterior edge of the flagellar pore. On the right of the ventral area there are two plates between the anterior and posterior called the right and right accessory sulcal plates. Along with the last of the five sulcal plates known as the anterior sulcal plate, the right accessory plate makes up the anterior edge of the flagellar pore. Only in C. gouretti and C. skogsbergii is there a sixth sulcal plate known as the left accessory sulcal plate, which is analogous to postcingular plate 1 in all other Ceratocorys species (Fig. 44A, 47B).

There are 6 postcingular plates in the Ceratocorys genus. All members of the genus with the exception of C. gouretti and C. skogsbergii have 6 plates; these two species only have plates two through six, as plate one has become the left accessory sulcal plate. Postcingular plates one and two are small and separated from plate three by a list, whereas plates three through six are large and, along with the antapical plate, make up the main body of the hypotheca. The last two plates that make up the theca of Ceratocorys cells is the posterior intercalary plate. The posterior intercalary plate is between the postcingular plates 1-2 and the antapical plate on the left of the sulcus (Fig. 44A).

The most closely related genus to Ceratocorys is Goniodoma, and the two can be differentiated by the number of plates making up the cell theca; Goniodoma has 11 epithecal plates instead of 10, and thus has a total of 30 instead of 29 plates. Furthermore, though the number of hypothecal plates between the two genera are the same, the makeup of the subcategories varies; Goniodoma has 5 postcingular plates, no intercalary plates, and 3 antapical plates.

Pores are visible in sulcal and main body plates, as well as forming two rows on the girdle plates. The theca of the genus is typically smooth or wrinkly with the exception of C. reticulata, which, as its name suggests, has a heavily reticulated plate texture. C. malayensis is also very reticulated

Lists are the flat protrusions that extend out from the surface of the cells (ex. on either side of the girdle). Transverse girdle lists attach to the girdle and can divide the girdle into a series of chambers (Fig. 47B), and there is also a list on the posterior cingular. Four lists are on the hypotheca; the right and left sulcal lists, and the left and right lateral lists, the last two of which may be absent depending on the species. There are also the ventral and dorsal body lists, which on C. horrida and C. gouretti have long spines not found in any other species in the genus.

Species in this genus have from two to six total spines. The ventral and dorsal spines are found only on C. horrida and C. gouretti, but every member has spines on the antapical plate. If the organism has four antapical spines they are found on all four corners of the antapical plate, if there are three the right corner is spineless, and if there are two the right and left corners lack spines (Fig. 47A). C. bipes is the only species with two antapical spines, C. skogsbergii and C. gouretti have three, and C. horrida, C. armata, C. reticulata, and C. aultii all have four. Smaller spines also exist on the larger spines of C. horrida and C. gouretti which look like brushes on the tips of the large spines (Fig. 47). Each spine is made on the junction of four lists, forming a sort of cross shape when looking down the spine. The lists of antapical spines are fairly short and do not extend far out, but the lists of the ventral and dorsal spines can extend quite far and join up with the other lists on the body surface.

As a dinoflagellate, Ceratocorys have two flagella. One, the transverse flagellum, is lodged in the girdle, and the other, the longitudinal flagellum, exits the cell through the flagellar pore. The transverse flagellum provides both forward motion and spin to the cell, while the longitudinal flagellum acts as a rudder to steer with.

Environmental differences have an effect on cell morphology of C. horrida. When cultured in still water, >80% of the population is considered "long-spined" with spines almost one cell diameter in length. When the water is continuously agitated to simulate light wind or surface chop at ocean surface the "short-spine" morphotype will, over time, become the dominant cell type. This morphotype's ventral and dorsal spines tend to disappear, while the remaining four antapical spines are shorter and wider than that of the "long-spined" cells. Furthermore, the cell volume halves, and mean vacuole size drops as well. Reduction of spines is due to material resorption during endoskeleton transformation rather than as a result of cell division. Once the water is returned to still conditions, the population will slowly recover back to being majority "long-spine" cells. In all cultures there is a small proportion of the population that is spineless, more angular in shape, and a cell volume approximately 1/3rd of the "long-spined" cells. The "long-spined" cells are both larger and denser than the "short-spined" cells but have a slower sinking rate than the "short-spine" cells. This is because the long spines provide more surface area, allowing the cell to take advantage of the viscosity of the water to reduce sinking. The "short-spined" morphotype's reduced swimming and faster sinking rate is likely an adaptation to avoid turbulent surface conditions and potential cell damage.

The dinokaryon is U-shaped and located in the posterior of the cell in at least C. malayensis; there has been no description of the shape of the nucleus in other species in this genus. Dinokaryons are the name for dinoflagellate nuclei, and are different from usual nuclei in that the DNA is not organized in nucleosomes, there are no histones, and chromosomes are always condensed.

=== Life cycle ===
This genus is only known to reproduce through binary fission, doubling their haploid genome to form diploid cells that then split off to form two haploid daughter cells. There is no information on whether or not Ceratocorys reproduce sexually, or what that process might entail. When the cell splits, one daughter cell receives the four antapical spines and must regrow the dorsal and ventral spines, and the other receives the dorsal and ventral spines and must regrow the four antapical spines (Fig. 48). When changing morphology from "long-spined" to "short-spined" and back, cells will fully convert to one morphology or the other before reproducing and switching between morphologies is an ability of each individual cell rather than a set phenotype due to changing genetics. Its absence at low temperatures indicates that active reproduction likely does not happen below 20 °C.

There has been no evidence of a cyst stage for any organism in this genus.

== Practical importance ==
Since C. horrida has nearly instantaneous bioluminescent reactions to different kinds of water flow, it is a good model organism for understanding plankton responses to water movement. Studying the changes in bioluminescence in different types of fluid movement connects organism response to small-scale fluid processes, which are important for understanding the community dynamics of plankton.

Due to its bioluminescent capabilities and sensitivity to different environmental molecules, C. horrida has been used by rapid toxicity tests like QwikLite to detect levels of different man-made contaminants and toxins in aquatic systems by measuring the reduction in light production of the organisms. Compared to toxicity tests that use organisms such as invertebrates or fish, testing using bioluminescent organisms such as C. horrida is far quicker and cheaper. Though species selection for QwikLite tests should depend on study-specific factors, usage of C. horrida stands as a viable option for rapid toxicity tests, as its sensitivity is comparable to several commonly used standardized tests.

Presence of C. horrida has also been found to be an indicator of oceanic upwellings. Despite its low abundance, it is one of the most common types of tropical peridinians, and so is also an indicator of tropical waters. Furthermore, its sensitivity and inability to stand low temperatures makes it unlikely to indicate waters of tropical origins far from the source point.
