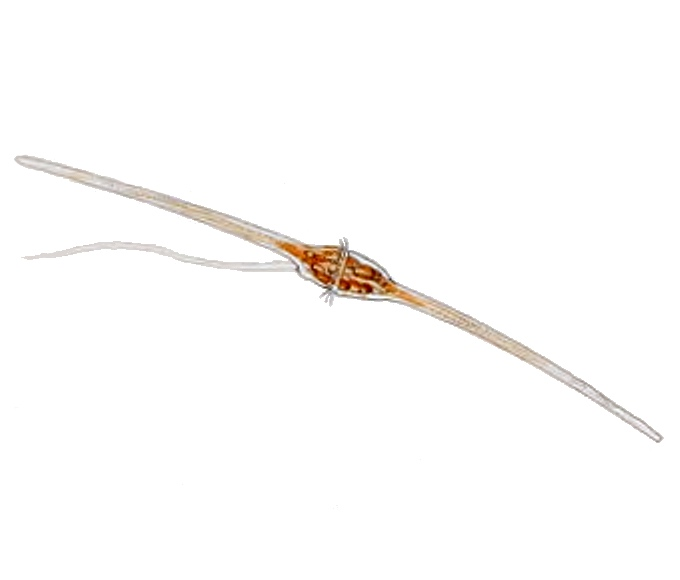
- Tripos fusus

Scientific classification
- Domain: Eukaryota
- Clade: Diaphoretickes
- Clade: SAR
- Clade: Alveolata
- Phylum: Myzozoa
- Superclass: Dinoflagellata
- Class: Dinophyceae
- Order: Gonyaulacales
- Family: Ceratiaceae
- Genus: Tripos; Bory de Saint-Vincent, 1823

Species
- See text

= Tripos (dinoflagellate) =

Genus of single-celled organisms

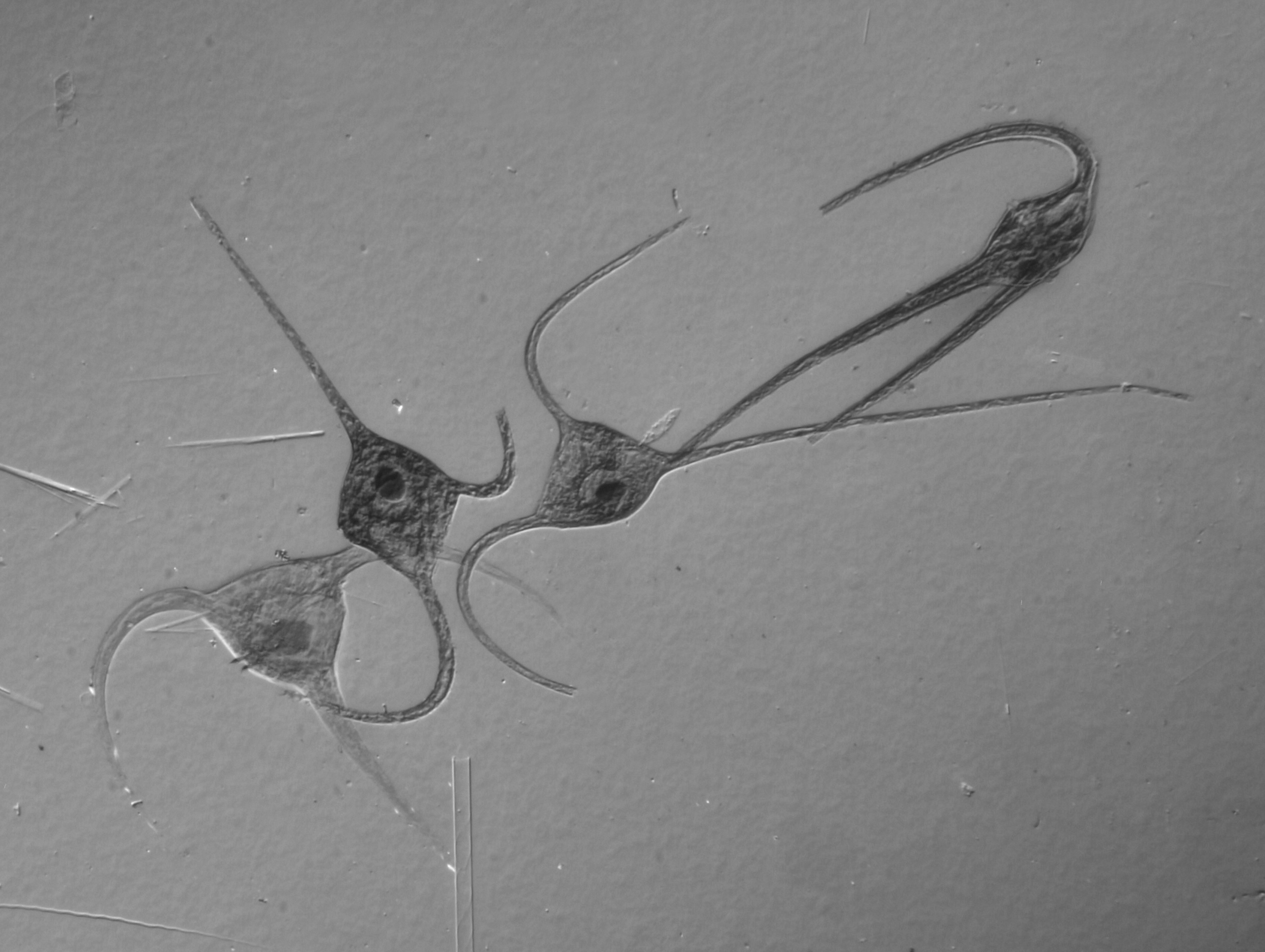
Tripos horridum

Tripos is a genus of marine dinoflagellates in the family Ceratiaceae. It was formerly part of Ceratium, then separated out as Neoceratium, a name subsequently determined to be invalid.

== Species ==
- Tripos aequatorialis (Schröder) F.Gómez
- Tripos aestuarius (Schröder) F.Gómez
- Tripos allieri (Gourret) F.Gómez
- Tripos angustocornis (N.Peters) F.Gómez
- Tripos angustus (A.S.Campbell) F.Gómez
- Tripos arcticus (Vanhöffen) F.Gómez
- Tripos arietinus (Cleve) F.Gómez
- Tripos aultii (H.W.Graham & Bronikovsky) F. Gómez
- Tripos axialis (Kofoid) F.Gómez
- Tripos azoricus (Cleve) F.Gómez
- Tripos balechii (Meave del Castillo, Okolodkov & M.E.Zamudio) F.Gómez
- Tripos balticus (F.Schütt) F.Gómez
- Tripos batavus (Paulsen) F.Gómez
- Tripos belone (Cleve) F.Gómez
- Tripos berghii (Gourret) F.Gómez
- Tripos biceps (Claparède & Lachmann) F.Gómez
- Tripos bicornis (Gourret) F.Gómez
- Tripos bigelowii (Kofoid) F.Gómez
- Tripos boehmii (H.W.Graham & Bronikovsky) F.Gómez
- Tripos brevis (Ostenfeld & Johannes Schmidt) F.Gómez
- Tripos brunellii (Rampi) F.Gómez
- Tripos bucephalus (Cleve) F.Gómez
- Tripos buceros (Zacharias) F.Gómez
- Tripos californiensis (Kofoid) F.Gómez
- Tripos candelabrus (Ehrenberg) F.Gómez
- Tripos carnegiei (H.W.Graham & Bronikovsky) F.Gómez
- Tripos carriensis (Gourret) F.Gómez
- Tripos cephalotus (Lemmermann) F.Gómez
- Tripos ceylanicus (Schröder) F.Gómez
- Tripos claviger (Kofoid) F.Gómez
- Tripos coarctus (Pavillard) F.Gómez
- Tripos compressus (Gran) F.Gómez
- Tripos concilians (Jørgenen) F.Gómez
- Tripos contortus (Gourret) F.Gómez
- Tripos contrarius (Gourret) F.Gómez
- Tripos curvicornis (Daday) F.Gómez
- Tripos dalmaticus (Schröder) F.Gómez
- Tripos declinatus (G.Karsten) F.Gómez
- Tripos deflexus (Kofoid) F.Gómez
- Tripos dens (Ostenfeld & Johannes Schmidt) F.Gómez
- Tripos denticulatus (Jörgenen) F.Gómez
- Tripos depressus (Gourret) F.Gómez
- Tripos digitatus (F.Schütt) F.Gómez
- Tripos dilatatus (Gourret) F.Gómez
- Tripos divaricatus (Lemmermann) F.Gómez
- Tripos egyptiacus (Halim) F.Gómez
- Tripos ehrenbergii (Kofoid) F.Gómez
- Tripos elegans (Schröder) F.Gómez
- Tripos euarcuatus (Jörgenen) F.Gómez
- Tripos eugrammus (Ehrenberg) F.Gómez
- Tripos extensus (Gourret) F.Gómez
- Tripos falcatiformis (Jörgenen) F.Gómez
- Tripos falcatus (Kofoid) F.Gómez
- Tripos filicornis (Steemann Nielsen) F.Gómez
- Tripos flagelliferus (Cleve) F.Gómez
- Tripos furca (Ehrenberg) F.Gómez
- Tripos fusus (Ehrenberg) F.Gómez
- Tripos gallicus (Kofoid) F.Gómez
- Tripos geniculatus (Lemmermann) F.Gómez
- Tripos gibberus (Gourret) F.Gómez
- Tripos globatus (Gourret) F.Gómez
- Tripos globosus (Gourret) F.Gómez
- Tripos gracilis (Pavillard) F.Gómez
- Tripos gravidus (Gourret) F.Gómez
- Tripos heterocamptus (Jörgenen) F.Gómez
- Tripos hexacanthus (Gourret) F.Gómez
- Tripos hircus (Schröder) F.Gómez
- Tripos horridus (Cleve) F.Gómez
- Tripos humilis (Jörgenen) F.Gómez
- Tripos hundhausenii (Schröder) F.Gómez
- Tripos hyperboreus (Cleve) F.Gómez
- Tripos incisus (Karsten) F.Gómez
- Tripos inclinatus (Karsten) F.Gómez
- Tripos inflatus (Karsten) F.Gómez
- Tripos intermedius (Jörgenen) F.Gómez
- Tripos inversus (Karsten) F.Gómez
- Tripos japonicus (Schröder) F.Gómez
- Tripos karstenii (Pavillard) F.Gómez
- Tripos kofoidii (Jörgenen) F.Gómez
- Tripos lamellicornis (Kofoid) F.Gómez
- Tripos lanceolatus (Kofoid) F.Gómez
- Tripos leptosomus (Jörgensen) F.Gómez
- Tripos limulus (Pouchet) F.Gómez
- Tripos lineatus (Ehrenberg) F.Gómez
- Tripos longinus (Karsten) F.Gómez
- Tripos longipes (J.W.Bailey) F.Gómez
- Tripos longirostrus (Gourret) F.Gómez
- Tripos longissimus (Schröder) F.Gómez
- Tripos lunula (Schimper ex Karsten) F.Gómez
- Tripos macroceros (Ehrenberg) F.Gómez
- Tripos massiliensis (Gourret) F.Gómez
- Tripos minor (Gourret) F.Gómez
- Tripos minutus (Jörgensen) F.Gómez
- Tripos mollis (Kofoid) F.Gómez
- Tripos muelleri Bory de Saint-Vincent
- Tripos neglectus (Ostenfeld) F.Gómez
- Tripos obesus (Pavillard) F.Gómez
- Tripos obliquus (Gourret) F.Gómez
- Tripos obtusus (Gourret) F.Gómez
- Tripos okamurae (Schröder) F.Gómez
- Tripos orthoceras (Jörgensen) F.Gómez
- Tripos ostenfeldii (Kofoid) F.Gómez
- Tripos oviformis (Daday) F.Gómez
- Tripos pacificus (Schröder) F.Gómez
- Tripos palmatus (Schröder) F.Gómez
- Tripos paradoxides (Cleve) F.Gómez
- Tripos parvus (Gourret) F.Gómez
- Tripos patentissimus (Ostenfeld & Johannes Schmidt) F.Gómez
- Tripos pavillardii (Jørgensen) F.Gómez
- Tripos pellucidus (Gourret) F.Gómez
- Tripos pennatus (Kofoid) F.Gómez
- Tripos pentagonus (Gourret) F.Gómez
- Tripos petersenii (Steemann Nielsen) F.Gómez
- Tripos platycornis (Daday) F.Gómez
- Tripos praelongus (Lemmermann) Gómez
- Tripos procerus (Gourret) F.Gómez
- Tripos protuberans (G.Karsten) F.Gómez
- Tripos pulchellus (Schröder) F.Gómez
- Tripos ramakrishnii (Subrahmanyan) F.Gómez
- Tripos ranipes (Cleve) F.Gómez
- Tripos recurvatus (Schröder) F.Gómez
- Tripos recurvus (Jørgesen) F.Gómez
- Tripos reflexus (Cleve) F.Gómez
- Tripos reticulatus (Pouchet) F.Gómez
- Tripos robustus (Ostenfeld & Johannes Schmidt) F.Gómez
- Tripos rostellus (Gourret) F.Gómez
- Tripos saltans (Schröder) F.Gómez
- Tripos scapiformis (Kofoid) F.Gómez
- Tripos schmidtii (Jørgesen) F.Gómez
- Tripos schoeteri (Schröder) F.Gómez
- Tripos schrankii (Kofoid) F.Gómez
- Tripos semipulchellus (Jørgesen) F.Gómez
- Tripos seta (Ehrenberg) F.Gómez
- Tripos setaceus (Jørgesen) F.Gómez
- Tripos strictus (Okamura & Nishikawa) F.Gómez
- Tripos subcontortus (Schröder) F.Gómez
- Tripos subrobustus (Jørgesen) F.Gómez
- Tripos subsalsus (Ostenfeld) F.Gómez
- Tripos sumatranus (Karsten) F.Gómez
- Tripos symmetricus (Pavillard) F.Gómez
- Tripos tasmaniae (E.J.F.Wood) F.Gómez
- Tripos tenuissimus (Kofoid) F.Gómez
- Tripos tricarinatus (Kofoid) F.Gómez
- Tripos trichoceros (Ehrenberg) Gómez
- Tripos tripodioides (Jørgesen) F.Gómez
- Tripos truncatus (Lohmann) F.Gómez
- Tripos uncinus (Sournia) F.Gómez
- Tripos uteri (A.S.Campbell) F.Gómez
- Tripos varians (Mangin) F.Gómez
- Tripos volans (Cleve) F.Gómez
- Tripos vultur (Cleve) F.Gómez
