= Dinoflagellate luciferase =

Type of light-emitting protein

Identifiers
- EC no.: 1.13.12.18
- CAS no.: 303183-71-3

Databases
- IntEnz: IntEnz view
- BRENDA: BRENDA entry
- ExPASy: NiceZyme view
- KEGG: KEGG entry
- MetaCyc: metabolic pathway
- PRIAM: profile
- PDB structures: RCSB PDB PDBe PDBsum
Search
- PMC: articles
- PubMed: articles
- NCBI: proteins

Dinoflagellate luciferase (EC 1.13.12.18, Gonyaulax luciferase) is a specific luciferase, an enzyme with systematic name dinoflagellate-luciferin:oxygen 132-oxidoreductase. It catalyses a chemical reaction which releases energy in the form of a photon of light:

dinoflagellate luciferin
O_{2}
H_{2}O
oxidised luciferin
+ hν

== Mechanism of Reaction ==
The EC number of dinoflagellate luciferase is 1.13.12.18. This number denotes that dinoflagellate luciferase is an oxidoreductase that acts on single donors with incorporation of molecular oxygen (oxygenases), with incorporation of one atom of oxygen (internal monooxygenases or internal mixed-function oxidases).

== Structure ==
Dinoflagellate luciferase is a single protein with three luciferase domains and an N-terminal domain. The three domains have been shown to be 1.8-A crystal structure that contain beta barrel pocketa that act as active sites with each domain preceded by a regulatory three helix bundle. These helical bundles contain important histidine residues that play a role in the pH regulation of dinoflagellate luciferase activity. Specifically, the presence of N-terminal intramolecularly conserved histidine residues are shown to be responsible for the loss of activity of the enzyme at high pH. Protonation of these histidine residues alters the conformation of each domain to allow the substrate luciferin to enter the enlarged pocket. This conformational change must occur in order to provide access and space for the ligand to enter the active site. At pH 8, the histidine residues remain unprotonated, interacting with a network of hydrogen bonds that block substrate access to the active site. This blockage is overcome by protonation of histidine residues or by experimental replacement of histidine residues with alanine residues. Realistically, alanine replacement does not occur spontaneously; however, this experimental result provides further evidence that the larger histidine residues block access to the active site of the enzyme. The N-terminal domain is conserved between dinoflagellate luciferase and luciferin binding proteins. This region may be where luciferin binding proteins interact with luciferase in order to allow the ligand, usually luciferin, to enter the active site.

== Reaction Conditions ==
Dinoflagellate luciferase is active in slightly acidic environments but in most cases requires the luciferin binding protein (LBP) to unbind from the dinoflagellate luciferin substrate; however, LBP binds luciferin at neutral to alkaline conditions. Although the primary mechanism is unknown, voltage-gated ion channels on scintillon membranes open, allowing an influx of protons to enter the organelle lowering the pH sufficiently for dinoflagellate luciferase to activate. G-protein coupled receptors and calcium ions also play a role in stimulating bioluminescence.

== Applications ==
Dinoflagellate luciferase is found in bioluminescent dinoflagellates, eukaryotic protists that are found in ocean surface waters. Dinoflagellate luciferase allows these organisms to emit blue light (max 475 nm) after stimulation. The light produced is theorized to act as a defense against predators or lure for prey. These organisms utilize scintillons which are specialized organelles that project from the cytoplasm into the acidic vacuole to produce this light. This is where the dinoflagellate luciferase enzyme is contained.
