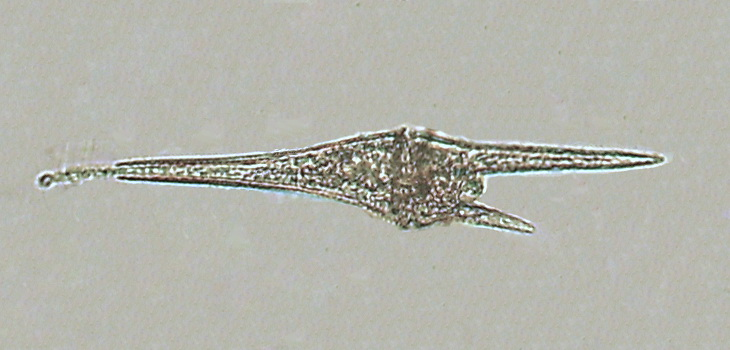

Scientific classification
- Domain: Eukaryota
- Clade: Diaphoretickes
- Clade: SAR
- Clade: Alveolata
- Phylum: Myzozoa
- Superclass: Dinoflagellata
- Class: Dinophyceae
- Order: Gonyaulacales
- Family: Ceratiaceae
- Genus: Ceratium
- Species: C. furca

Binomial name
- Ceratium furca (Ehrenberg) Claparéde & Lachmann

Synonyms
- Peridinium furca

= Ceratium furca =

Species of single-celled organism

Ceratium furca is a species of marine dinoflagellates.

== Description ==
This species has a straight body which is 70-200 μm long and 30-50 μm wide, with the epitheca gradually tapering into an anterior horn. C. furca has long spines, and is an "armoured" species with a theca of thick cellulose plates. The cells are nearly flat, with the ventral side concave and the dorsal side being convex.

== Distribution ==
Ceratium furca is found worldwide.

== Subspecies ==
- Ceratium furca eugrammum
- Ceratium furca furca
