= Plug-in electric vehicles in Maine =

As of April 2022, there were about 6,000 electric vehicles in Maine. As of 2021, 2.4% of new vehicles sold in the state were electric.

== Government policy ==
As of March 2022, the state government offers tax rebates of $2,000 for electric vehicle purchases, and $1,000 for plug-in hybrid vehicle purchases. Maine's climate action plan calls for getting 219,000 electric vehicles on Maine roads by 2030. In 2023, only about 9,500 electric vehicles were registered in Maine.

== Charging stations ==
As of 2021, there were 265 charging stations in Maine. According to Forbes Advisor in 2023, Maine ranks number 4 nationally on its list of the electric vehicle charger access based on the ratio of electric vehicles to vehicle charging stations in the state.

== Manufacturing ==
Maine contains a large number of deposits of lithium, a key component of electric vehicle batteries, including the largest deposit in the country in Newry. These deposits have led Maine to be proposed as a hub for mining lithium for use in batteries.

== By region ==
=== Portland ===
As of June 2021, there were 250 public charging stations in Portland.
