= Scintillon =

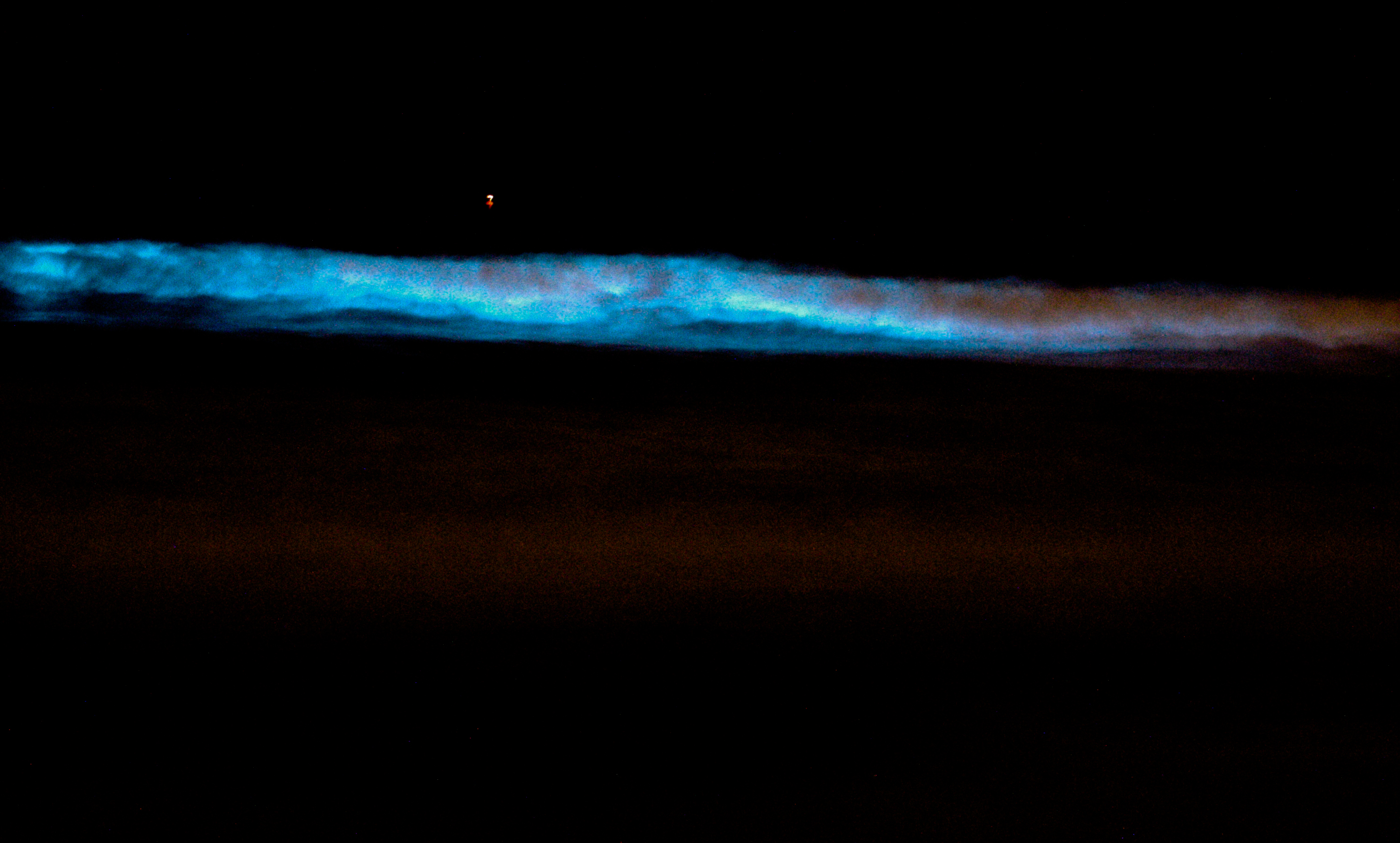
Glowing dinoflagellate bloom

Scintillons are small structures in cytoplasm that produce light. Among bioluminescent organisms, only dinoflagellates have scintillons.

== Description ==
=== Dinoflagellate light production ===
Marine dinoflagellates at night can emit blue light by bioluminescence, a process also called "the phosphorescence of the seas". Light production in these single celled organisms is produced by small structures in the cytoplasm called scintillons. Among bioluminescent organisms, only dinoflagellates have scintillons. In the dinoflagellates, the biochemical reaction that produces light involves a luciferase-catalysed oxidation of a linear tetrapyrrole called luciferin. The dinoflagellate Lingulodinium polyedra (previously called Gonyaulax polyedra) also contains a second protein called luciferin binding protein (LBP) that has been proposed to protect luciferin from non-luminescent oxidation. Luciferin is released from LBP by a decrease in pH, and the same decreased pH also activates the luciferase. Light production in the dinoflagellates occurs in bioluminescent organelles called scintillons and can be stimulated by agitation of the surrounding seawater.

=== Use of term scintillon ===
The name scintillon was first used to describe cytoplasmic particles isolated from a bioluminescent species of dinoflagellate that were able to produce a flash of light in response to a decrease in pH. Scintillons were first observed in L. polyedra by fluorescence microscopy, where they appear as small blue dots close to the cell surface. This blue fluorescence is due to the presence of the bioluminescence reaction substrate, a naturally fluorescent molecule called luciferin. When light production is stimulated by addition of dilute acid to the cells under the microscope, the site of light production corresponds to the location of the scintillons. Furthermore, the natural luciferin fluorescence is reduced after the light producing reaction.

=== Observation after freezing ===
Cells observed under the electron microscope after a technique involving rapid freezing of the cells followed by substitution of water with a polymer (Fast-freeze Fixation/Freeze Substitution) contain a large number of electron dense bodies around the cell periphery. These structures correspond in size and location to the fluorescent bodies confirmed to be scintillons by their light emission, and they show colocalization of anti-luciferase and anti-LBP labeling meaning both bioluminescence proteins are found in the structures. Scintillons appear as cytoplasmic drops hanging in the vacuolar space, as they are almost completely surrounded by the vacuolar membrane. This structure led to the proposal that a voltage gated proton channel in the vacuolar membrane could allow an action potential to be propagated along the vacuolar membrane. This would in turn let protons enter into the cytoplasm around all the scintillons in the cells virtually simultaneously producing an intense but brief flash of light. Voltage gated proton channels were subsequently identified in a dinoflagellate confirming their predicted existence.

=== Variance in emittance of light over time ===
Scintillons have been extensively purified from L. polyedra by centrifugation, and these purified scintillon preparations contain luciferase and luciferin binding protein as the only detectable protein components. The amount of luciferase, LBP and luciferin all vary over the course of a daily (circadian) period, as do the number of scintillons in the cell. These observations suggest that the circadian control of bioluminescence involves a daily synthesis and degradation of luciferase and LBP. When synthesized, these two proteins aggregate together and migrate to the vacuole membrane where LBP binds luciferin and the scintillons acquires an ability to produce light upon stimulation.

=== Variety in differing species ===
Scintillons are not identical in different species. Scintillons isolated from dinoflagellates belonging to the genus Pyrocystis such as P. lunula (previously Dissodinium lunula) or P. noctiluca are less dense than those of L. polyedra and do not contain LBP. Little is known about the structure or composition of scintillons in species other than L. polyedra.
