= Lingulodiniaceae =

Scientific classification
- Domain: Eukaryota
- Clade: Diaphoretickes
- Clade: SAR
- Clade: Alveolata
- Phylum: Myzozoa
- Superclass: Dinoflagellata
- Class: Dinophyceae
- Order: Gonyaulacales
- Family: Lingulodiniaceae; W.A.Sarjeant & C.Downie

Family of algae

Lingulodiniaceae is a family of dinoflagellates belonging to the order Gonyaulacales.

Genera:

- Amylax A.Meunier
- Lingulodinium D.Wall
- Sourniaea H.Gu, K.N.Mertens, Zhun Li & H.H.Shin
