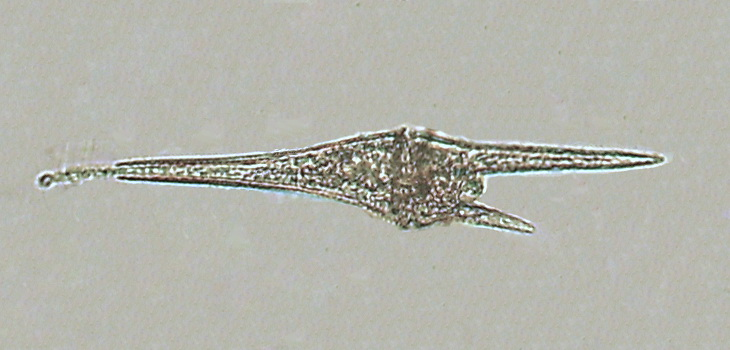
- Ceratium furca

Scientific classification
- Domain: Eukaryota
- Clade: Diaphoretickes
- Clade: SAR
- Clade: Alveolata
- Phylum: Myzozoa
- Superclass: Dinoflagellata
- Class: Dinophyceae
- Order: Gonyaulacales
- Family: Ceratiaceae; Kofoid, 1907

Genera
- Amphiceratium; Biceratium; Ceratium; Ceratophorus; Tripos

= Ceratiaceae =

Family of single-celled organisms

Ceratiaceae is a family of dinoflagellates in the order Gonyaulacales.
