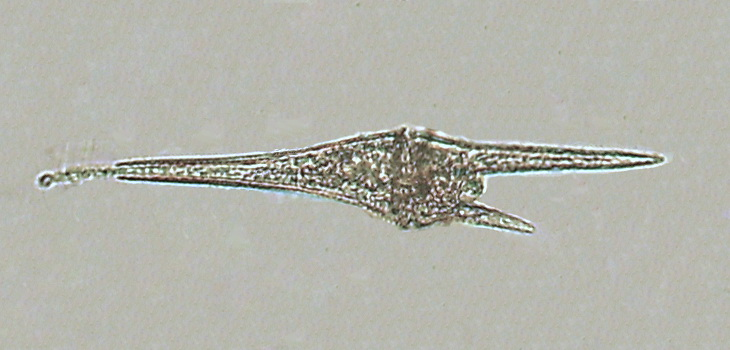
- Ceratium furca

Scientific classification
- Domain: Eukaryota
- Clade: Sar
- Clade: Alveolata
- Phylum: Dinoflagellata
- Class: Dinophyceae
- Order: Gonyaulacales; F.J.R.Taylor 1980

Families
- Areoligeraceae; †Belodiniaceae; Ceratiaceae; Ceratocoryaceae; Cladopyxidaceae; Goniodomataceae; Gonyaulacaceae; Heterodiniaceae; †Hystrichosphaeridiaceae; Lingulodiniaceae; Ostreopsidaceae; Pareodiniaceae; Protoceratiaceae; †Pterospermopsidaceae; Pyrocystaceae; Pyrophacaceae

= Gonyaulacales =

Order of single-celled organisms

Gonyaulacales is an order of dinoflagellates found in marine environments.
