= Marine sediment =

Accumulated material on seafloor

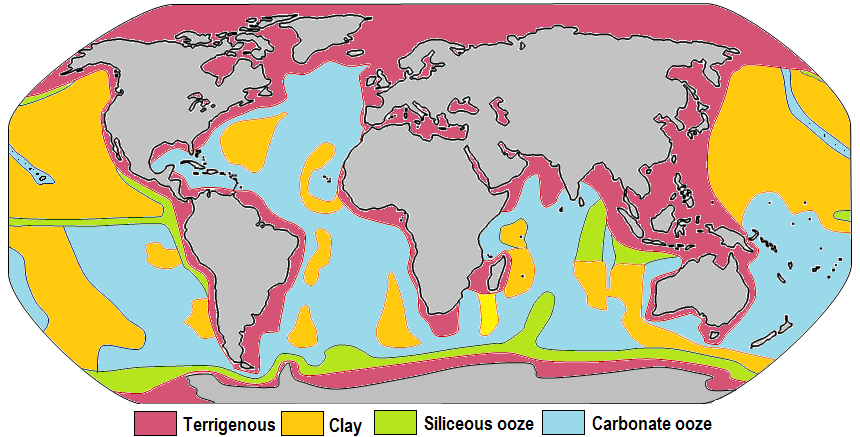
Distribution of sediment types on the seafloor Within each colored area, the type of material shown is what dominates, although other materials are also likely to be present. For further information about this diagram see below ↓

Marine sediment, or ocean sediment, or seafloor sediment, are deposits of insoluble particles that have accumulated on the seafloor. These particles either have their origins in soil and rocks and have been transported from the land to the sea, mainly by rivers but also by dust carried by wind and by the flow of glaciers into the sea, or they are biogenic deposits from marine organisms or from chemical precipitation in seawater, as well as from underwater volcanoes and meteorite debris.

Except within a few kilometres of a mid-ocean ridge, where the volcanic rock is still relatively young, most parts of the seafloor are covered in sediment. This material comes from several different sources and is highly variable in composition. Seafloor sediment can range in thickness from a few millimetres to several tens of kilometres. Near the surface seafloor sediment remains unconsolidated, but at depths of hundreds to thousands of metres the sediment becomes lithified (turned to rock).

Rates of sediment accumulation are relatively slow throughout most of the ocean, in many cases taking thousands of years for any significant deposits to form. Sediment transported from the land accumulates the fastest, on the order of one metre or more per thousand years for coarser particles. However, sedimentation rates near the mouths of large rivers with high discharge can be orders of magnitude higher. Biogenous oozes accumulate at a rate of about one centimetre per thousand years, while small clay particles are deposited in the deep ocean at around one millimetre per thousand years.

Sediments from the land are deposited on the continental margins by surface runoff, river discharge, and other processes. Turbidity currents can transport this sediment down the continental slope to the deep ocean floor. The deep ocean floor undergoes its own process of spreading out from the mid-ocean ridge, and then slowly subducts accumulated sediment on the deep floor into the molten interior of the earth. In turn, molten material from the interior returns to the surface of the earth in the form of lava flows and emissions from deep sea hydrothermal vents, ensuring the process continues indefinitely. The sediments provide habitat for a multitude of marine life, particularly of marine microorganisms. Their fossilized remains contain information about past climates, plate tectonics, ocean circulation patterns, and the timing of major extinctions.

== Overview ==
Except within a few kilometres of a mid-ocean ridge, where the volcanic rock is still relatively young, most parts of the seafloor are covered in sediments. This material comes from several different sources and is highly variable in composition, depending on proximity to a continent, water depth, ocean currents, biological activity, and climate. Seafloor sediments (and sedimentary rocks) can range in thickness from a few millimetres to several tens of kilometres. Near the surface, the sea-floor sediments remain unconsolidated, but at depths of hundreds to thousands of metres (depending on the type of sediment and other factors) the sediment becomes lithified.

The various sources of seafloor sediment can be summarized as follows:

- Terrigenous sediment is derived from continental sources transported by rivers, wind, ocean currents, and glaciers. It is dominated by quartz, feldspar, clay minerals, iron oxides, and terrestrial organic matter.
- Pelagic carbonate sediment is derived from organisms (e.g., foraminifera) living in the ocean water (at various depths, but mostly near surface) that make their shells (a.k.a. tests) out of carbonate minerals such as calcite.
- Pelagic silica sediment is derived from marine organisms (e.g., diatoms and radiolaria) that make their tests out of silica (microcrystalline quartz).
- Volcanic ash and other volcanic materials are derived from both terrestrial and submarine eruptions.
- Iron and manganese nodules form as direct precipitates from ocean-bottom water.

The distributions of some of these materials around the seas are shown in the diagram at the start of this article ↑. Terrigenous sediments predominate near the continents and within inland seas and large lakes. These sediments tend to be relatively coarse, typically containing sand and silt, but in some cases even pebbles and cobbles. Clay settles slowly in nearshore environments, but much of the clay is dispersed far from its source areas by ocean currents. Clay minerals are predominant over wide areas in the deepest parts of the ocean, and most of this clay is terrestrial in origin. Siliceous oozes (derived from radiolaria and diatoms) are common in the south polar region, along the equator in the Pacific, south of the Aleutian Islands, and within large parts of the Indian Ocean. Carbonate oozes are widely distributed in all of the oceans within equatorial and mid-latitude regions. In fact, clay settles everywhere in the oceans, but in areas where silica- and carbonate-producing organisms are prolific, they produce enough silica or carbonate sediment to dominate over clay.

Carbonate sediments are derived from a wide range of near-surface pelagic organisms that make their shells out of carbonate. These tiny shells, and the even tinier fragments that form when they break into pieces, settle slowly through the water column, but they don't necessarily make it to the bottom. While calcite is insoluble in surface water, its solubility increases with depth (and pressure) and at around 4,000 m, the carbonate fragments dissolve. This depth, which varies with latitude and water temperature, is known as the carbonate compensation depth. As a result, carbonate oozes are absent from the deepest parts of the ocean (deeper than 4,000 m), but they are common in shallower areas such as the mid-Atlantic ridge, the East Pacific Rise (west of South America), along the trend of the Hawaiian/Emperor Seamounts (in the northern Pacific), and on the tops of many isolated seamounts.

== Texture ==
The Wentworth scale classifies sediment by grain size

Sediment texture can be examined in several ways. The first way is grain size. Sediments can be classified by particle size according to the Wentworth scale. Clay sediments are the finest with a grain diameter of less than .004 mm and boulders are the largest with grain diameters of 256 mm or larger. Among other things, grain size represents the conditions under which the sediment was deposited. High energy conditions, such as strong currents or waves, usually results in the deposition of only the larger particles as the finer ones will be carried away. Lower energy conditions will allow the smaller particles to settle out and form finer sediments.

Well-sorted sediments (left) have particles that are all of a similar size. Poorly sorted sediments (right) consist of particles of a wide range of sizes

Differences in grain shape, such as sphericity (vertical) and rounding (horizontal)

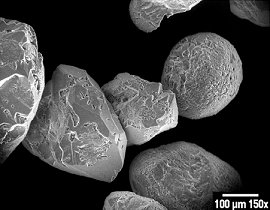
Scanning electron micrograph showing grains of silica sand

Sorting is another way to categorize sediment texture. Sorting refers to how uniform the particles are in terms of size. If all of the particles are of a similar size, such as in beach sand, the sediment is well-sorted. If the particles are of very different sizes, the sediment is poorly sorted, such as in glacial deposits.

A third way to describe marine sediment texture is its maturity, or how long its particles have been transported by water. One way which can indicate maturity is how round the particles are. The more mature a sediment the rounder the particles will be, as a result of being abraded over time. A high degree of sorting can also indicate maturity, because over time the smaller particles will be washed away, and a given amount of energy will move particles of a similar size over the same distance. Lastly, the older and more mature a sediment the higher the quartz content, at least in sediments derived from rock particles. Quartz is a common mineral in terrestrial rocks, and it is very hard and resistant to abrasion. Over time, particles made from other materials are worn away, leaving only quartz behind. Beach sand is a very mature sediment; it is composed primarily of quartz, and the particles are rounded and of similar size (well-sorted).

== Origins ==
Marine sediments can also classified by their source of origin. There are four types:

- Lithogenous sediments, also called terrigenous sediments, are derived from preexisting rock and come from land via rivers, ice, wind and other processes. They are referred to as terrigenous sediments since most comes from the land.
- Biogenous sediments are composed of the remains of marine organisms, and come from organisms like plankton when their exoskeletons break down
- Hydrogenous sediments come from chemical reactions in the water, and are formed when materials that are dissolved in water precipitate out and form solid particles.
- Cosmogenous sediments are derived from extraterrestrial sources, coming from space, filtering in through the atmosphere or carried to Earth on meteorites.

=== Lithogenous ===
Lithogenous or terrigenous sediment is primarily composed of small fragments of preexisting rocks that have made their way into the ocean. These sediments can contain the entire range of particle sizes, from microscopic clays to large boulders, and they are found almost everywhere on the ocean floor. Lithogenous sediments are created on land through the process of weathering, where rocks and minerals are broken down into smaller particles through the action of wind, rain, water flow, temperature- or ice-induced cracking, and other erosive processes. These small eroded particles are then transported to the oceans through a variety of mechanisms:

Streams and rivers: Various forms of runoff deposit large amounts of sediment into the oceans, mostly in the form of finer-grained particles. About 90% of the lithogenous sediment in the oceans is thought to have come from river discharge, particularly from Asia. Most of this sediment, especially the larger particles, will be deposited and remain fairly close to the coastline, however, smaller clay particles may remain suspended in the water column for long periods of time and may be transported great distances from the source.

Wind: Windborne (aeolian) transport can take small particles of sand and dust and move them thousands of kilometres from the source. These small particles can fall into the ocean when the wind dies down, or can serve as the nuclei around which raindrops or snowflakes form. Aeolian transport is particularly important near desert areas.

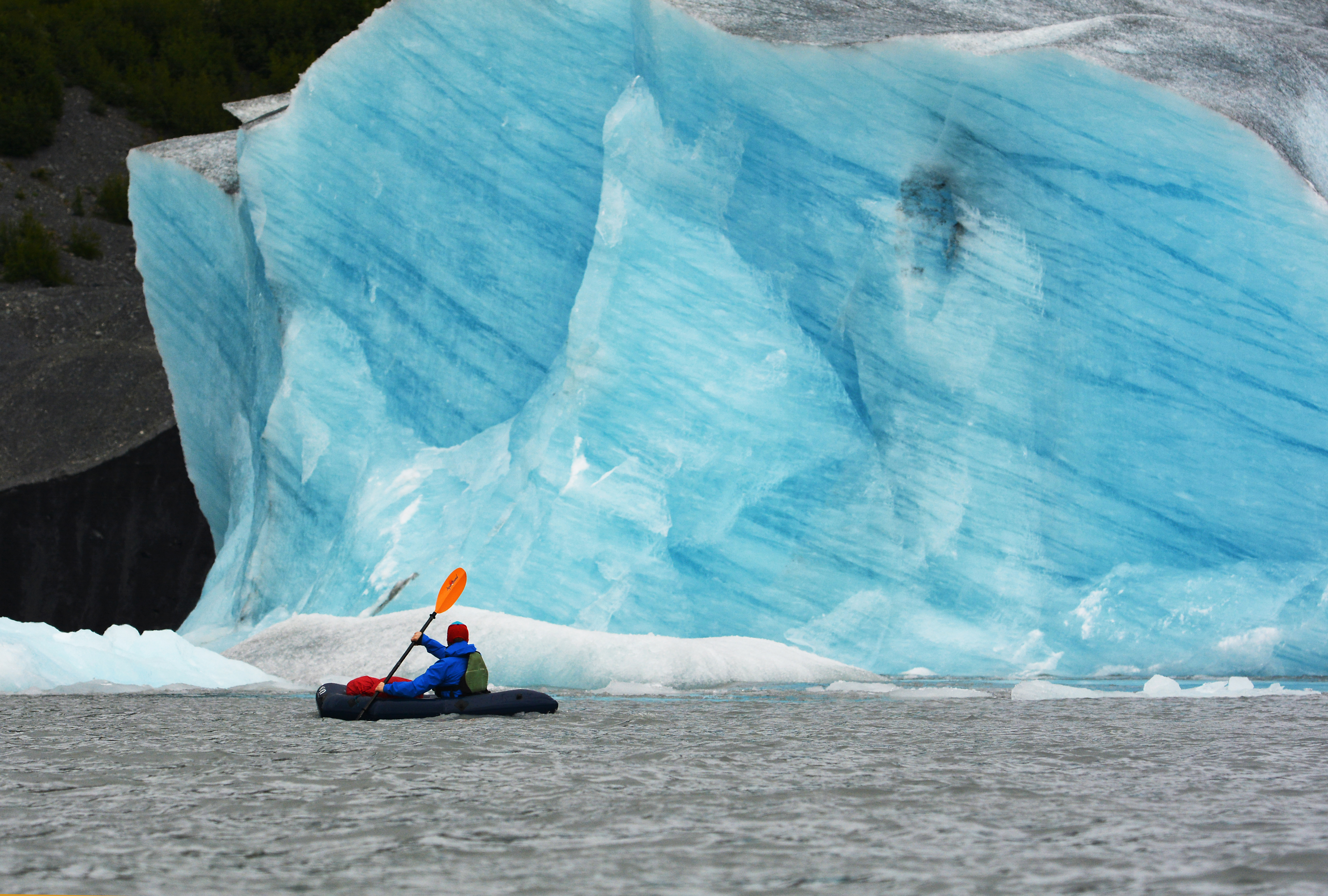
The face of blue glacial ice melting into the sea

River discharge in the Yukon Delta, Alaska. The pale color demonstrates the large amounts of sediment released into the ocean via the rivers.

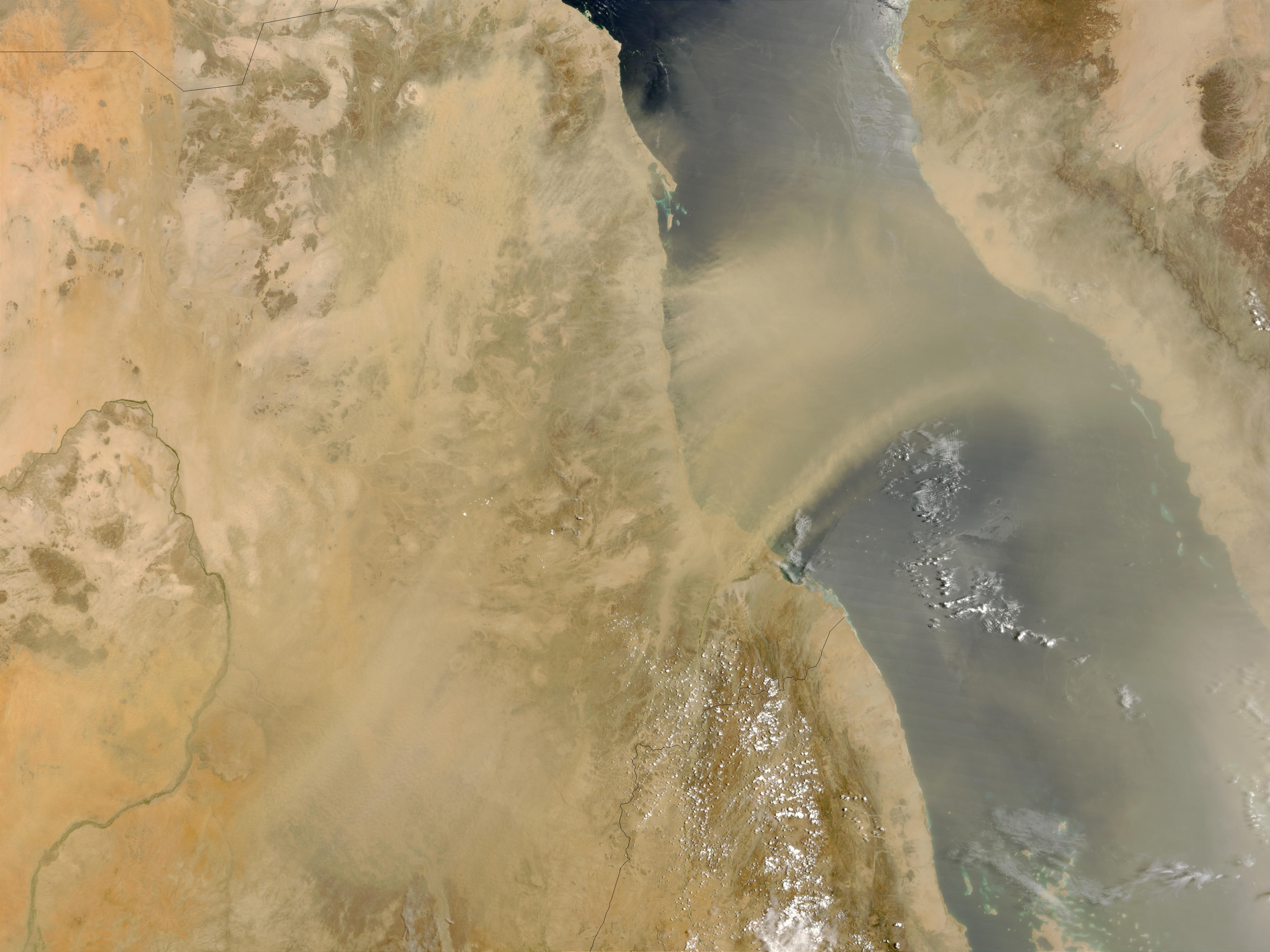
A plume of wind-borne particles from Sudan (left) blow over the Red Sea

Glaciers and ice rafting: As glaciers grind their way over land, they pick up lots of soil and rock particles, including very large boulders, that get carried by the ice. When the glacier meets the ocean and begins to break apart or melt, these particles get deposited. Most of the deposition will happen close to where the glacier meets the water, but a small amount of material is also transported longer distances by rafting, where larger pieces of ice drift far from the glacier before releasing their sediment.

Gravity: Landslides, mudslides, avalanches, and other gravity-driven events can deposit large amounts of material into the ocean when they happen close to shore.

Waves: Wave action along a coastline will erode rocks and will pull loose particles from beaches and shorelines into the water.

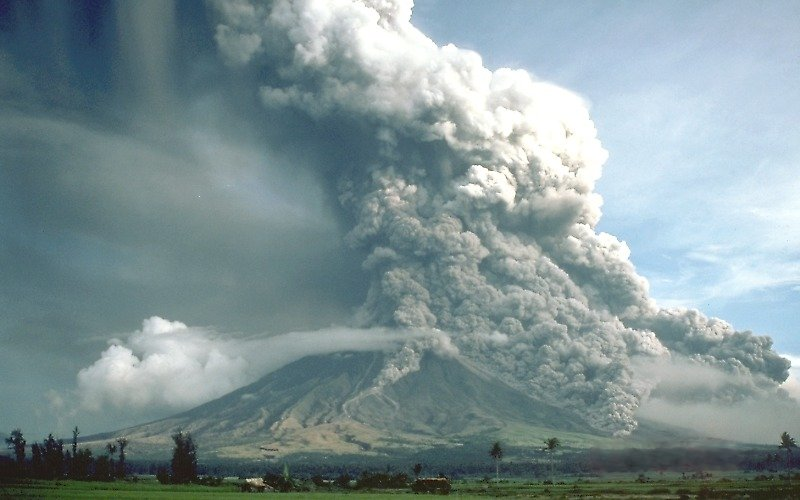
Eruption of the Mayon Volcano, Philippines, in 1984. Much of the material spewed from a volcanic eruption may eventually make its way into the oceans

Volcanoes: Volcanic eruptions emit vast amounts of ash and other debris into the atmosphere, where it can then be transported by wind to eventually get deposited in the oceans.

Gastroliths: Another, relatively minor, means of transporting lithogenous sediment to the ocean are gastroliths. Gastrolith means "stomach stone". Many animals, including seabirds, pinnipeds, and some crocodiles deliberately swallow stones and regurgitate them latter. Stones swallowed on land can be regurgitated at sea. The stones can help grind food in the stomach or act as ballast regulating buoyancy. Mostly these processes deposit lithogenous sediment close to shore. Sediment particles can then be transported farther by waves and currents, and may eventually escape the continental shelf and reach the deep ocean floor.

Composition

Lithogenous sediments usually reflect the composition of whatever materials they were derived from, so they are dominated by the major minerals that make up most terrestrial rock. This includes quartz, feldspar, clay minerals, iron oxides, and terrestrial organic matter. Quartz (silicon dioxide, the main component of glass) is one of the most common minerals found in nearly all rocks, and it is very resistant to abrasion, so it is a dominant component of lithogenous sediments, including sand.

=== Biogenous ===
Biogenous sediments come from the remains of living organisms that settle out as sediment when the organisms die. It is the "hard parts" of the organisms that contribute to the sediments; things like shells, teeth or skeletal elements, as these parts are usually mineralized and are more resistant to decomposition than the fleshy "soft parts" that rapidly deteriorate after death.

Macroscopic sediments contain large remains, such as skeletons, teeth, or shells of larger organisms. This type of sediment is fairly rare over most of the ocean, as large organisms do not die in enough of a concentrated abundance to allow these remains to accumulate. One exception is around coral reefs; here there is a great abundance of organisms that leave behind their remains, in particular the fragments of the stony skeletons of corals that make up a large percentage of tropical sand.

Microscopic sediment consists of the hard parts of microscopic organisms, particularly their shells, or tests. Although very small, these organisms are highly abundant and as they die by the billions every day their tests sink to the bottom to create biogenous sediments. Sediments composed of microscopic tests are far more abundant than sediments from macroscopic particles, and because of their small size they create fine-grained, mushy sediment layers. If the sediment layer consists of at least 30% microscopic biogenous material, it is classified as a biogenous ooze. The remainder of the sediment is often made up of clay.

Reconstructing past climate
through sediment analysis

Biogenous sediments can allow the reconstruction of past climate history from oxygen isotope ratios. Oxygen atoms exist in three forms, or isotopes, in ocean water: O16, O17 and O18 (the number refers to the atomic masses of the isotopes). O16 is the most common form, followed by O18 (O17 is rare). O16 is lighter than O18, so it evaporates more easily, leading to water vapor that has a higher proportion of O16. During periods of cooler climate, water vapor condenses into rain and snow, which forms glacial ice that has a high proportion of O16. The remaining seawater therefore has a relatively higher proportion of O18. Marine organisms which incorporate dissolved oxygen into their shells as calcium carbonate will have shells with a higher proportion of O18 isotope. This means the ratio of O16:O18 in shells is low during periods of colder climate. When climate warms, glacial ice melts releasing O16 from the ice and returning it to the oceans, increasing the O16:O18 ratio in the water. When organisms incorporate oxygen into their shells, the shells will contain a higher O16:O18 ratio. Scientists can therefore examine biogenous sediments, calculate the O16:O18 ratios for samples of known ages, and from those ratios, infer the climate conditions under which those shells were formed. The same types of measurements can also be taken from ice cores; a decrease of 1 ppm O18 between ice samples represents a decrease in temperature of 1.5°C.

The primary sources of microscopic biogenous sediments are unicellular algaes and protozoans (single-celled amoeba-like creatures) that secrete tests of either calcium carbonate (CaCO_{3}) or silica (SiO_{2}). Silica tests come from two main groups, the diatoms (algae) and the radiolarians (protozoans).

Diatoms are particularly important members of the phytoplankton, functioning as small, drifting algal photosynthesizers. A diatom consists of a single algal cell surrounded by an elaborate silica shell that it secretes for itself. Diatoms come in a range of shapes, from elongated, pennate forms, to round, or centric shapes that often have two halves, like a Petri dish. In areas where diatoms are abundant, the underlying sediment is rich in silica diatom tests, and is called diatomaceous earth.

Radiolarians are planktonic protozoans (making them part of the zooplankton), that like diatoms, secrete a silica test. The test surrounds the cell and can include an array of small openings through which the radiolarian can extend an amoeba-like "arm" or pseudopod. Radiolarian tests often display a number of rays protruding from their shells which aid in buoyancy. Oozes that are dominated by diatom or radiolarian tests are called siliceous oozes.

Like the siliceous sediments, the calcium carbonate, or calcareous sediments are also produced from the tests of microscopic algae and protozoans; in this case the coccolithophores and foraminiferans. Coccolithophores are single-celled planktonic algae about 100 times smaller than diatoms. Their tests are composed of a number of interlocking CaCO_{3} plates (coccoliths) that form a sphere surrounding the cell. When coccolithophores die the individual plates sink out and form an ooze. Over time, the coccolithophore ooze lithifies to becomes chalk. The White Cliffs of Dover in England are composed of coccolithophore-rich ooze that turned into chalk deposits.

Foraminiferans (also referred to as forams) are protozoans whose tests are often chambered, similar to the shells of snails. As the organism grows, is secretes new, larger chambers in which to reside. Most foraminiferans are benthic, living on or in the sediment, but there are some planktonic species living higher in the water column. When coccolithophores and foraminiferans die, they form calcareous oozes.

Older calcareous sediment layers contain the remains of another type of organism, the discoasters; single-celled algae related to the coccolithophores that also produced calcium carbonate tests. Discoaster tests were star-shaped, and reached sizes of 5-40 μm across. Discoasters went extinct approximately 2 million years ago, but their tests remain in deep, tropical sediments that predate their extinction.

Because of their small size, these tests sink very slowly; a single microscopic test may take about 10–50 years to sink to the bottom! Given that slow descent, a current of only 1 cm/sec could carry the test as much as 15,000 km away from its point of origin before it reaches the bottom. Despite this, the sediments in a particular location are well-matched to the types of organisms and degree of productivity that occurs in the water overhead. This means the sediment particles must be sinking to the bottom at a much faster rate, so they accumulate below their point of origin before the currents can disperse them. Most of the tests do not sink as individual particles; about 99% of them are first consumed by some other organism, and are then aggregated and expelled as large fecal pellets, which sink much more quickly and reach the ocean floor in only 10–15 days. This does not give the particles as much time to disperse, and the sediment below will reflect the production occurring near the surface. The increased rate of sinking through this mechanism has been called the "fecal express".

=== Hydrogenous ===
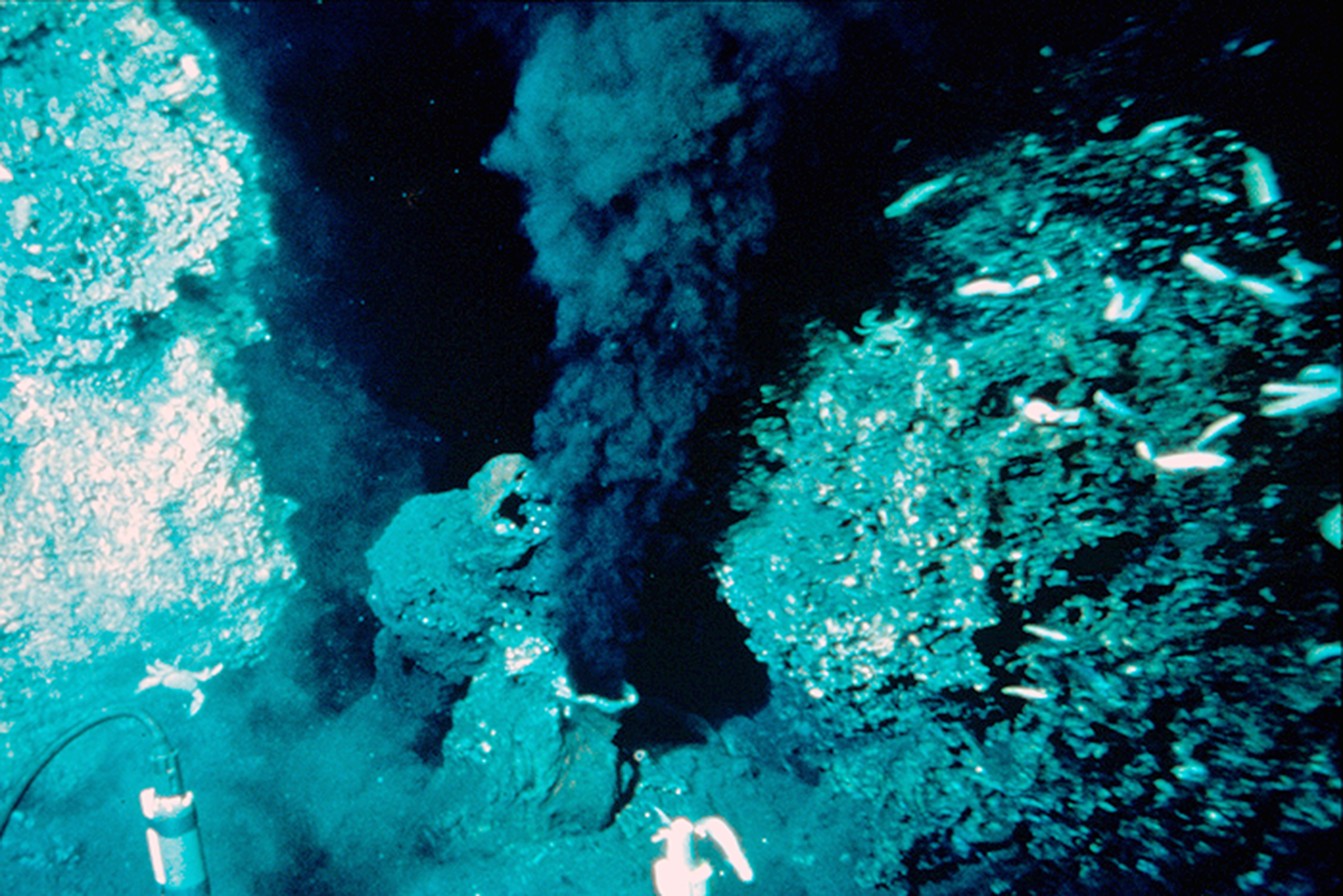
Black smoker hydrothermal vent. The "smoke" consists of dissolved particles that precipitate into solids when exposed to colder water

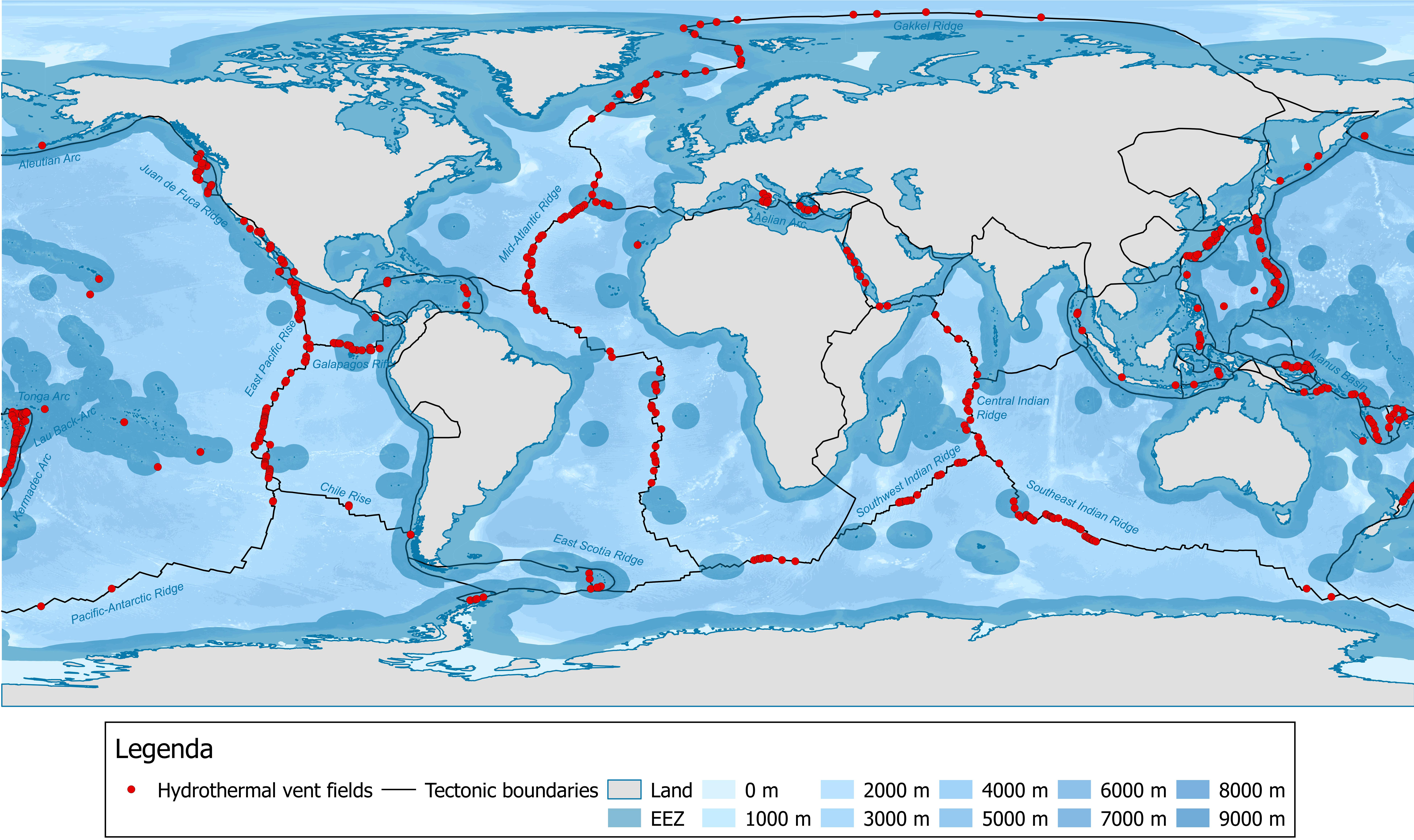
Hydrothermal vents occur mostly along the mid-ocean ridges

Seawater contains many different dissolved substances. Occasionally chemical reactions occur that cause these substances to precipitate out as solid particles, which then accumulate as hydrogenous sediment. These reactions are usually triggered by a change in conditions, such as a change in temperature, pressure, or pH, which reduces the amount of a substance that can remain in a dissolved state. There is not a lot of hydrogenous sediment in the ocean compared to lithogenous or biogenous sediments, but there are some interesting forms.

In hydrothermal vents seawater percolates into the seafloor where it becomes superheated by magma before being expelled by the vent. This superheated water contains many dissolved substances, and when it encounters the cold seawater after leaving the vent, these particles precipitate out, mostly as metal sulfides. These particles make up the "smoke" that flows from a vent, and may eventually settle on the bottom as hydrogenous sediment. Hydrothermal vents are distributed along the Earth's plate boundaries, although they may also be found at intra-plate locations such as hotspot volcanoes. Currently there are about 500 known active submarine hydrothermal vent fields, about half visually observed at the seafloor and the other half suspected from water column indicators and/or seafloor deposits.

Manganese nodules are rounded lumps of manganese and other metals that form on the seafloor, generally ranging between 3–10 cm in diameter, although they may sometimes reach up to 30 cm. The nodules form in a manner similar to pearls; there is a central object around which concentric layers are slowly deposited, causing the nodule to grow over time. The composition of the nodules can vary somewhat depending on their location and the conditions of their formation, but they are usually dominated by manganese- and iron oxides. They may also contain smaller amounts of other metals such as copper, nickel and cobalt. The precipitation of manganese nodules is one of the slowest geological processes known; they grow on the order of a few millimetres per million years. For that reason, they only form in areas where there are low rates of lithogenous or biogenous sediment accumulation, because any other sediment deposition would quickly cover the nodules and prevent further nodule growth. Therefore, manganese nodules are usually limited to areas in the central ocean, far from significant lithogenous or biogenous inputs, where they can sometimes accumulate in large numbers on the seafloor (Figure 12.4.2 right). Because the nodules contain a number of commercially valuable metals, there has been significant interest in mining the nodules over the last several decades, although most of the efforts have thus far remained at the exploratory stage. A number of factors have prevented large-scale extraction of nodules, including the high costs of deep sea mining operations, political issues over mining rights, and environmental concerns surrounding the extraction of these non-renewable resources.

Evaporites are hydrogenous sediments that form when seawater evaporates, leaving the dissolved materials to precipitate into solids, particularly halite (salt, NaCl). In fact, the evaporation of seawater is the oldest form of salt production for human use, and is still carried out today. Large deposits of halite evaporites exist in a number of places, including under the Mediterranean Sea. Beginning around 6 million years ago, tectonic processes closed off the Mediterranean Sea from the Atlantic, and the warm climate evaporated so much water that the Mediterranean was almost completely dried out, leaving large deposits of salt in its place (an event known as the Messinian Salinity Crisis). Eventually the Mediterranean re-flooded about 5.3 million years ago, and the halite deposits were covered by other sediments, but they still remain beneath the seafloor.

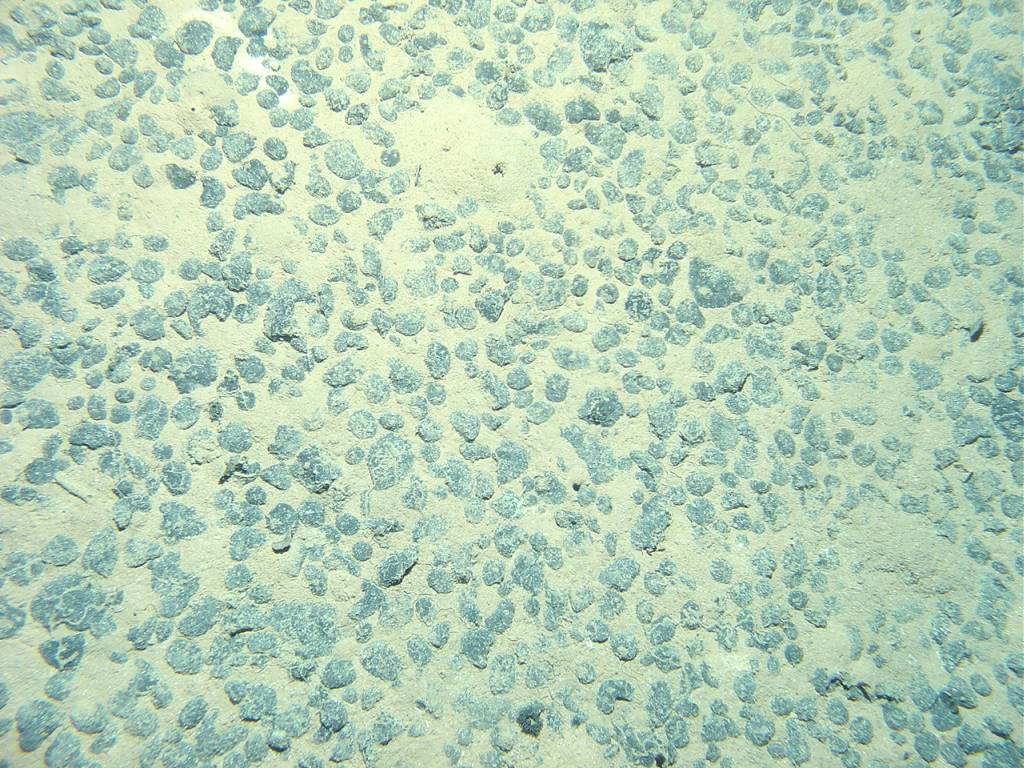
Manganese nodules on the seabed

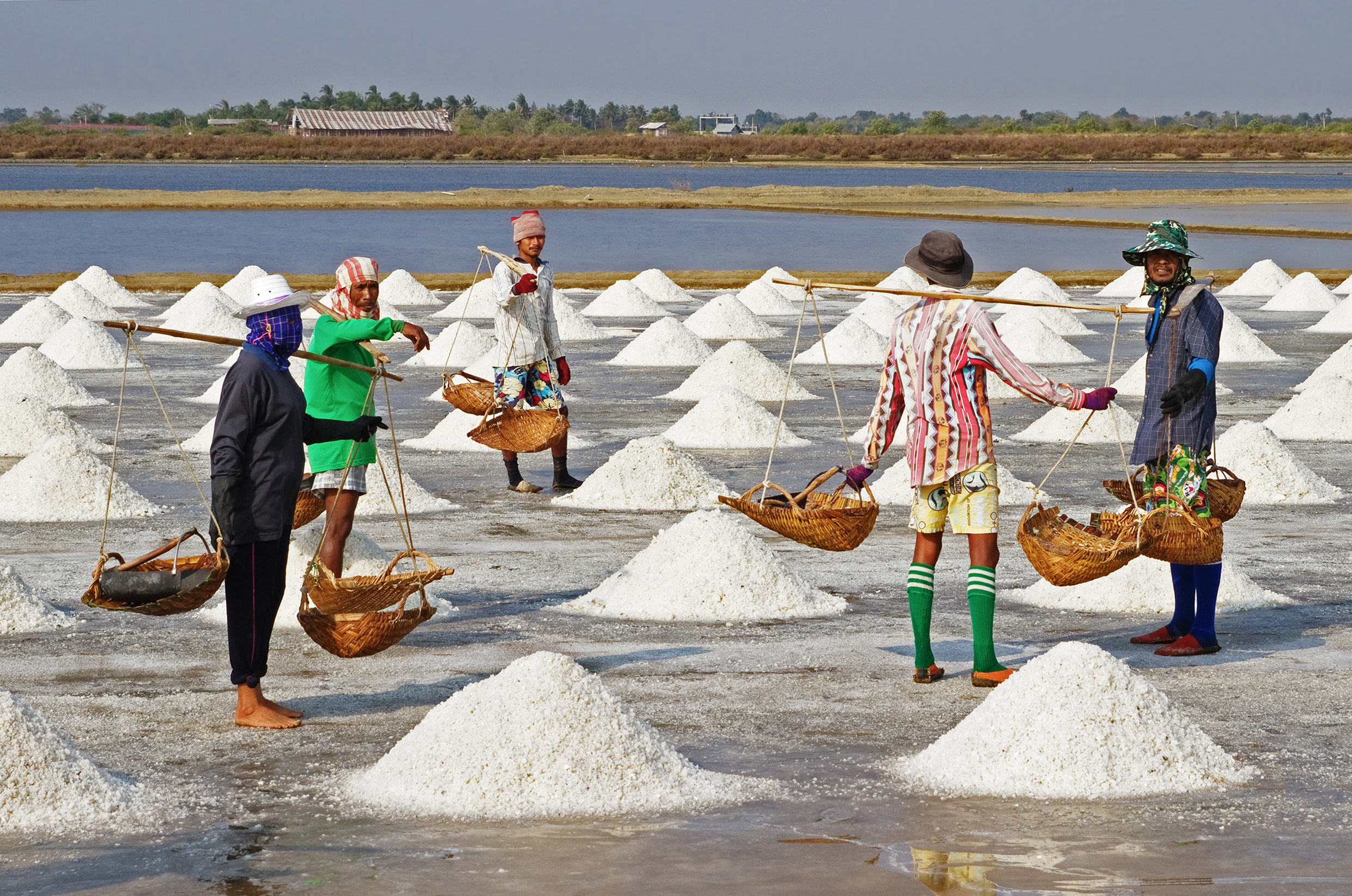
Harvesting salt left behind from the evaporation of seawater, Thailand

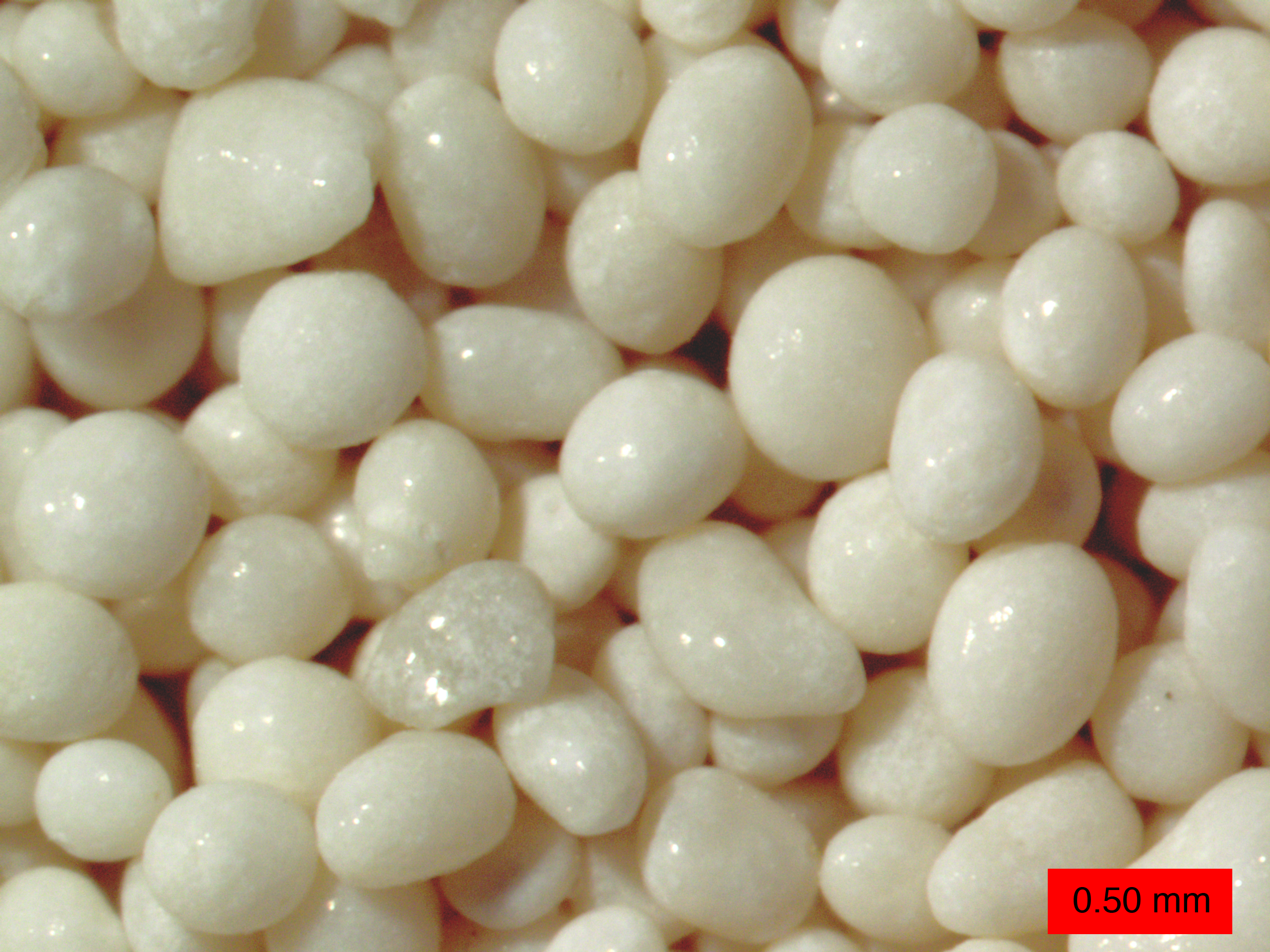
Oolites from a beach
in the Bahamas

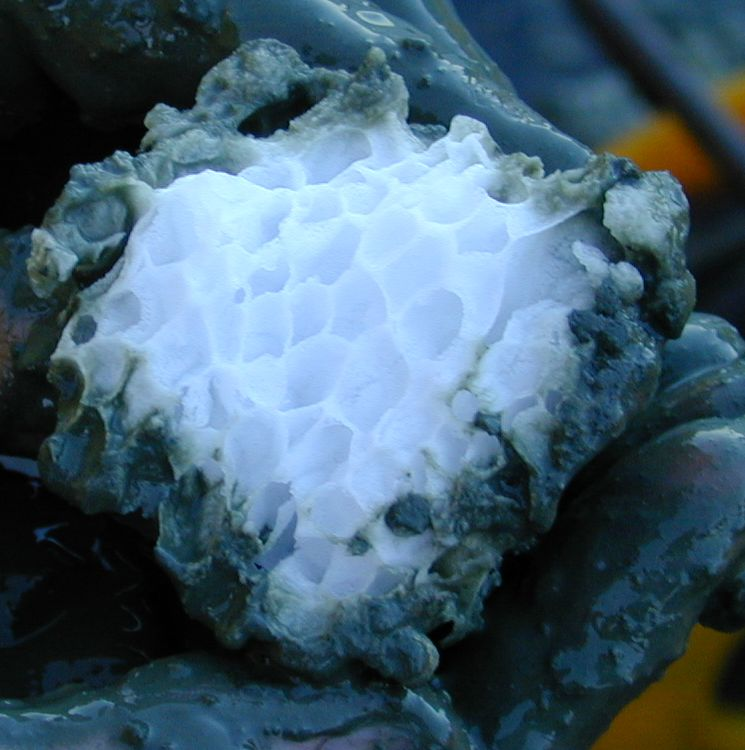
Gas hydrate from
a subduction zone

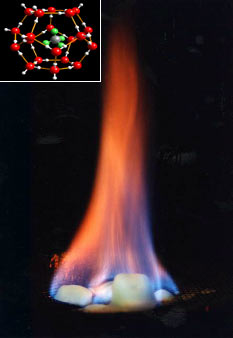
Burning hydrate ("burning ice")

Oolites are small, rounded grains formed from concentric layers of precipitation of material around a suspended particle. They are usually composed of calcium carbonate, but they may also from phosphates and other materials. Accumulation of oolites results in oolitic sand, which is found in its greatest abundance in the Bahamas.

Methane hydrates are another type of hydrogenous deposit with a potential industrial application. All terrestrial erosion products include a small proportion of organic matter derived mostly from terrestrial plants. Tiny fragments of this material plus other organic matter from marine plants and animals accumulate in terrigenous sediments, especially within a few hundred kilometres of shore. As the sediments pile up, the deeper parts start to warm up (from geothermal heat), and bacteria get to work breaking down the contained organic matter. Because this is happening in the absence of oxygen (a.k.a. anaerobic conditions), the by-product of this metabolism is the gas methane (CH_{4}). Methane released by the bacteria slowly bubbles upward through the sediment toward the seafloor. At water depths of 500 m to 1,000 m, and at the low temperatures typical of the seafloor (close to 4 °C), water and methane combine to create a substance known as methane hydrate. Within a few metres to hundreds of metres of the seafloor, the temperature is low enough for methane hydrate to be stable and hydrates accumulate within the sediment. Methane hydrate is flammable because when it is heated, the methane is released as a gas. The methane within seafloor sediments represents an enormous reservoir of fossil fuel energy. Although energy corporations and governments are anxious to develop ways to produce and sell this methane, anyone that understands the climate-change implications of its extraction and use can see that this would be folly.

=== Cosmogenous ===
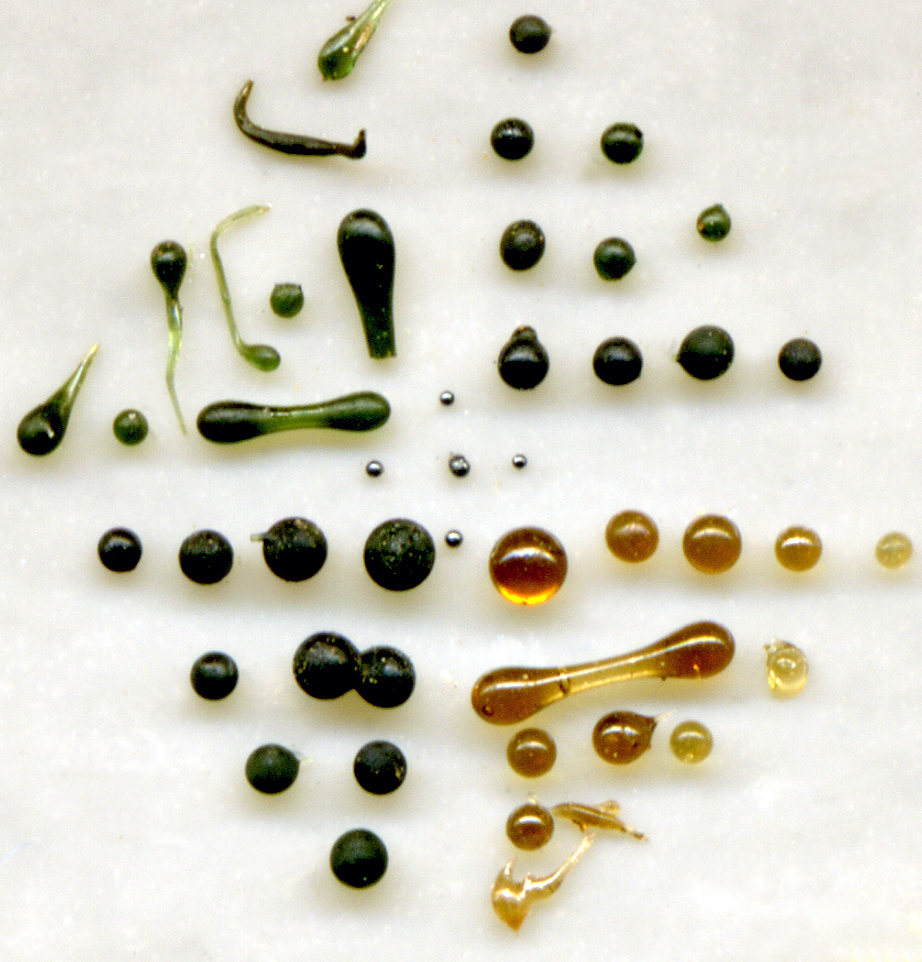
Tektite-like glass found in western Russia

Cosmogenous sediment is derived from extraterrestrial sources, and comes in two primary forms; microscopic spherules and larger meteor debris. Spherules are composed mostly of silica or iron and nickel, and are thought to be ejected as meteors burn up after entering the atmosphere. Meteor debris comes from collisions of meteorites with Earth. These high impact collisions eject particles into the atmosphere that eventually settle back down to Earth and contribute to the sediments. Like spherules, meteor debris is mostly silica or iron and nickel. One form of debris from these collisions are tektites, which are small droplets of glass. They are likely composed of terrestrial silica that was ejected and melted during a meteorite impact, which then solidified as it cooled upon returning to the surface.

Cosmogenous sediment is fairly rare in the ocean and it does not usually accumulate in large deposits. However, it is constantly being added to through space dust that continuously rains down on Earth. About 90% of incoming cosmogenous debris is vaporized as it enters the atmosphere, but it is estimated that 5 to 300 tons of space dust land on the Earth's surface each day.

== Composition ==
=== Siliceous ooze ===
Siliceous ooze is a type of biogenic pelagic sediment located on the deep ocean floor. Siliceous oozes are the least common of the deep sea sediments, and make up approximately 15% of the ocean floor. Oozes are defined as sediments which contain at least 30% skeletal remains of pelagic microorganisms. Siliceous oozes are largely composed of the silica based skeletons of microscopic marine organisms such as diatoms and radiolarians. Other components of siliceous oozes near continental margins may include terrestrially derived silica particles and sponge spicules. Siliceous oozes are composed of skeletons made from opal silica Si(O_{2}), as opposed to calcareous oozes, which are made from skeletons of calcium carbonate organisms (i.e. coccolithophores). Silica (Si) is a bioessential element and is efficiently recycled in the marine environment through the silica cycle. Distance from land masses, water depth and ocean fertility are all factors that affect the opal silica content in seawater and the presence of siliceous oozes.

Siliceous ooze
mineral forms	protist involved	name of skeleton	typical size	
SiO_{2} silica quartz glass opal chert	diatom	frustule	0.002 to 0.2 mm	diatom microfossil from 40 million years ago
SiO_{2} silica quartz glass opal chert	radiolarian	test or shell	0.1 to 0.2 mm	elaborate silica shell of a radiolarian

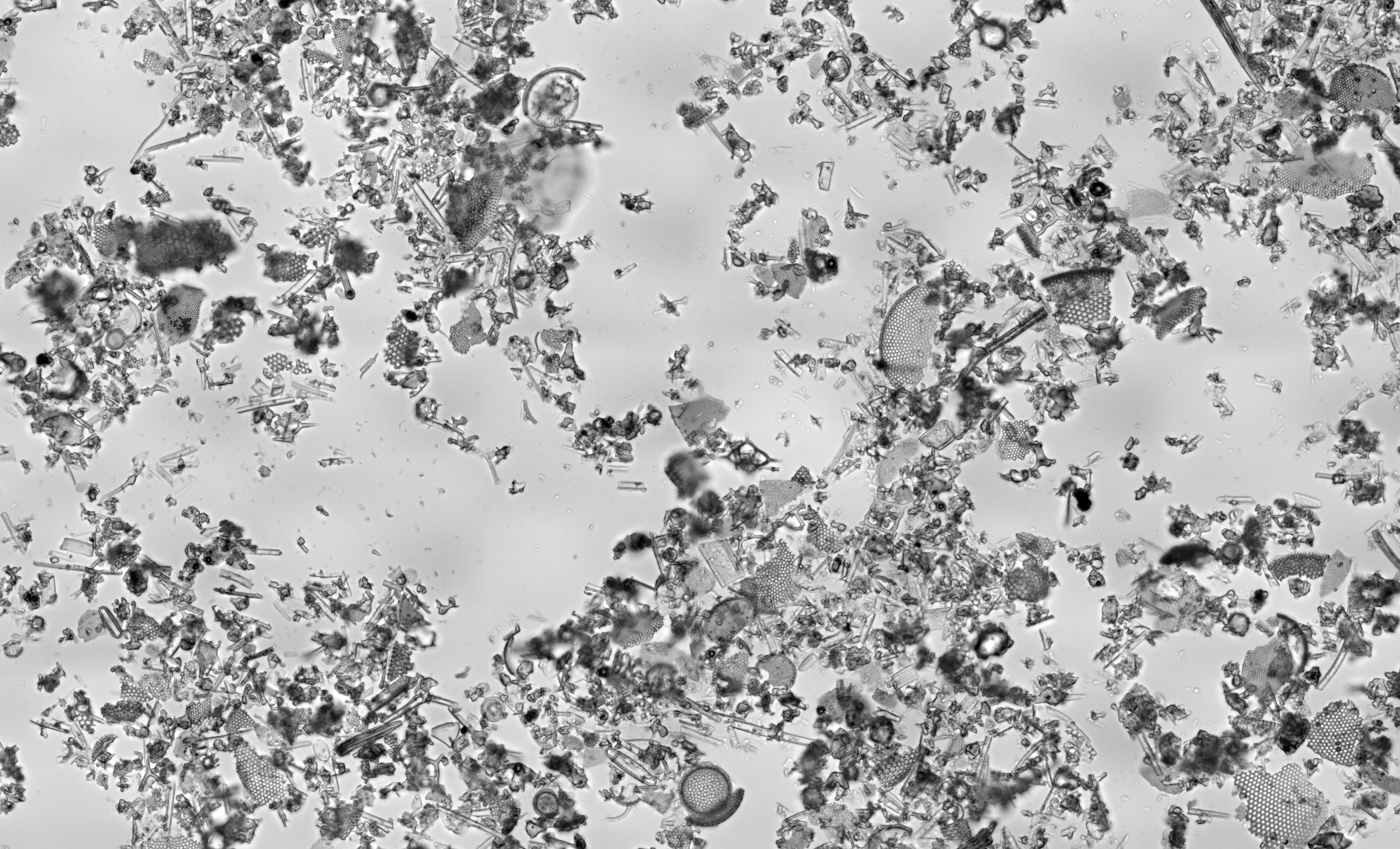
Diatomaceous earth is a soft, siliceous, sedimentary rock made up of microfossils in the form of the frustules (shells) of single cell diatoms
(click 3X to fully magnify)

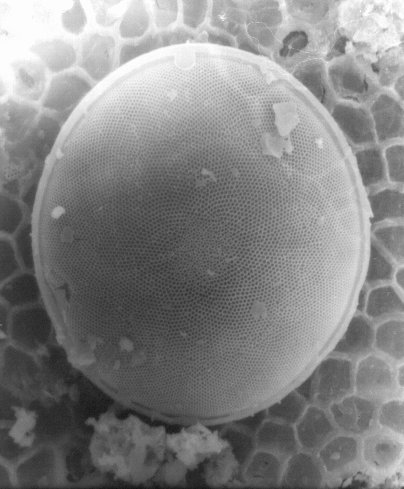
Centric diatom

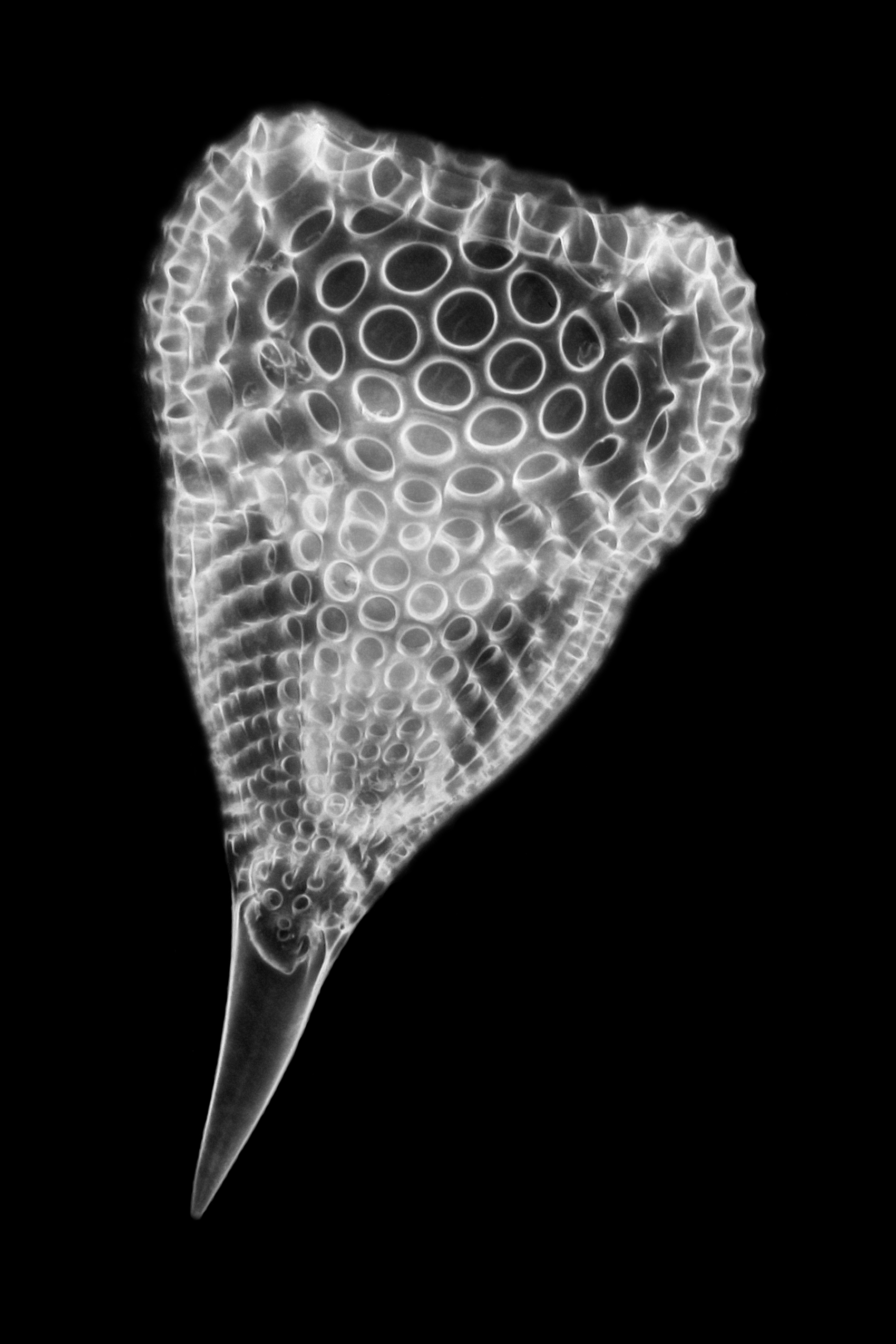
Radiolarian

=== Calcareous ooze ===
The term calcareous can be applied to a fossil, sediment, or sedimentary rock which is formed from, or contains a high proportion of, calcium carbonate in the form of calcite or aragonite. Calcareous sediments (limestone) are usually deposited in shallow water near land, since the carbonate is precipitated by marine organisms that need land-derived nutrients. Generally speaking, the farther from land sediments fall, the less calcareous they are. Some areas can have interbedded calcareous sediments due to storms, or changes in ocean currents. Calcareous ooze is a form of calcium carbonate derived from planktonic organisms that accumulates on the sea floor. This can only occur if the ocean is shallower than the carbonate compensation depth. Below this depth, calcium carbonate begins to dissolve in the ocean, and only non-calcareous sediments are stable, such as siliceous ooze or pelagic red clay.

Calcareous ooze
mineral forms	protist involved	name of skeleton	typical size	
CaCO_{3} calcite aragonite limestone marble chalk	foraminiferan	test or shell	under 1 mm	Calcified test of a planktic foraminiferan. There are about 10,000 living species of foraminiferans
CaCO_{3} calcite aragonite limestone marble chalk	coccolithophore	coccoliths	under 0.1 mm	Coccolithophores are the largest global source of biogenic calcium carbonate, and significantly contribute to the global carbon cycle. They are the main constituent of chalk deposits such as the white cliffs of Dover.

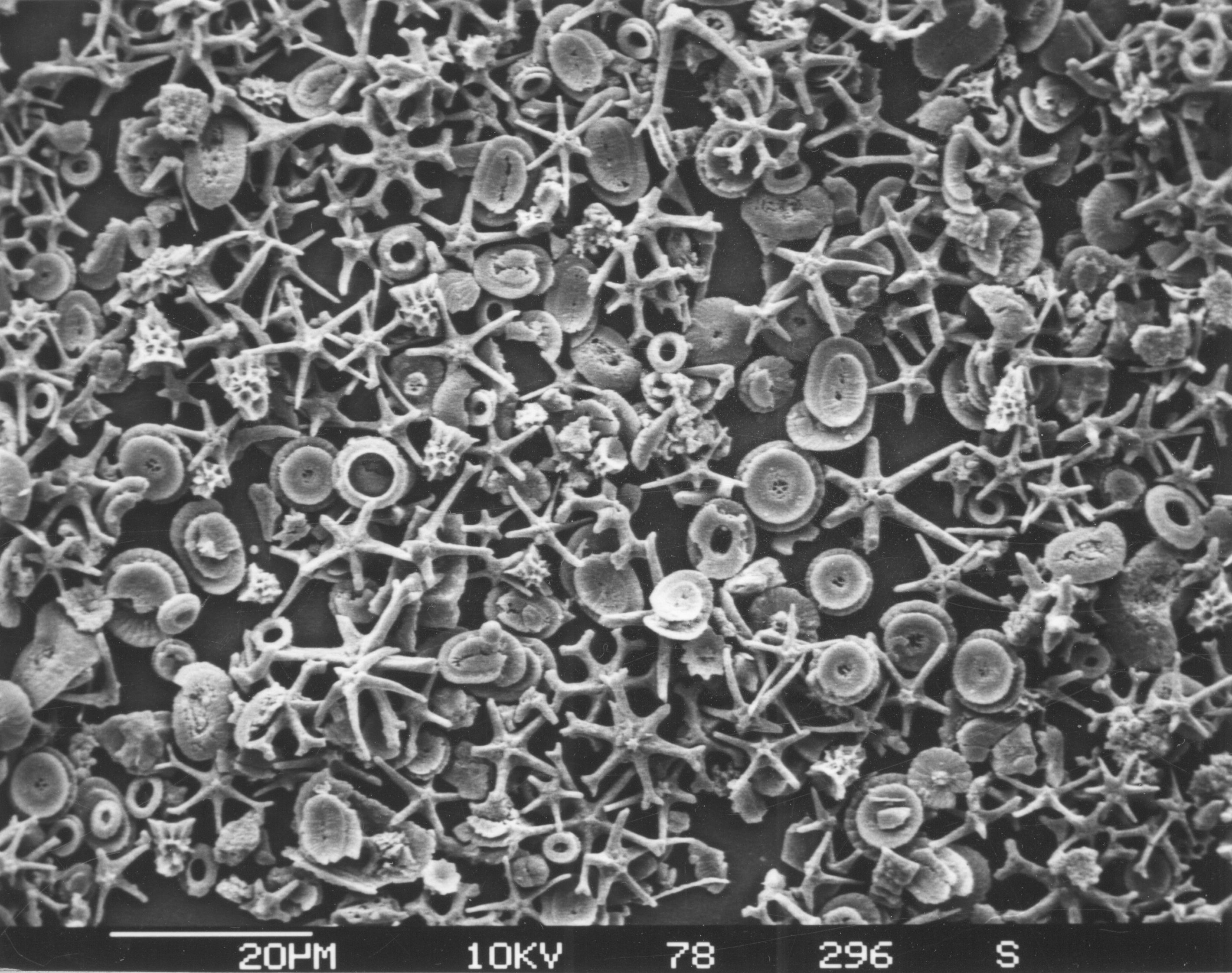
Calcareous microfossils from marine sediment consisting mainly of star-shaped discoaster with a sprinkling of coccoliths

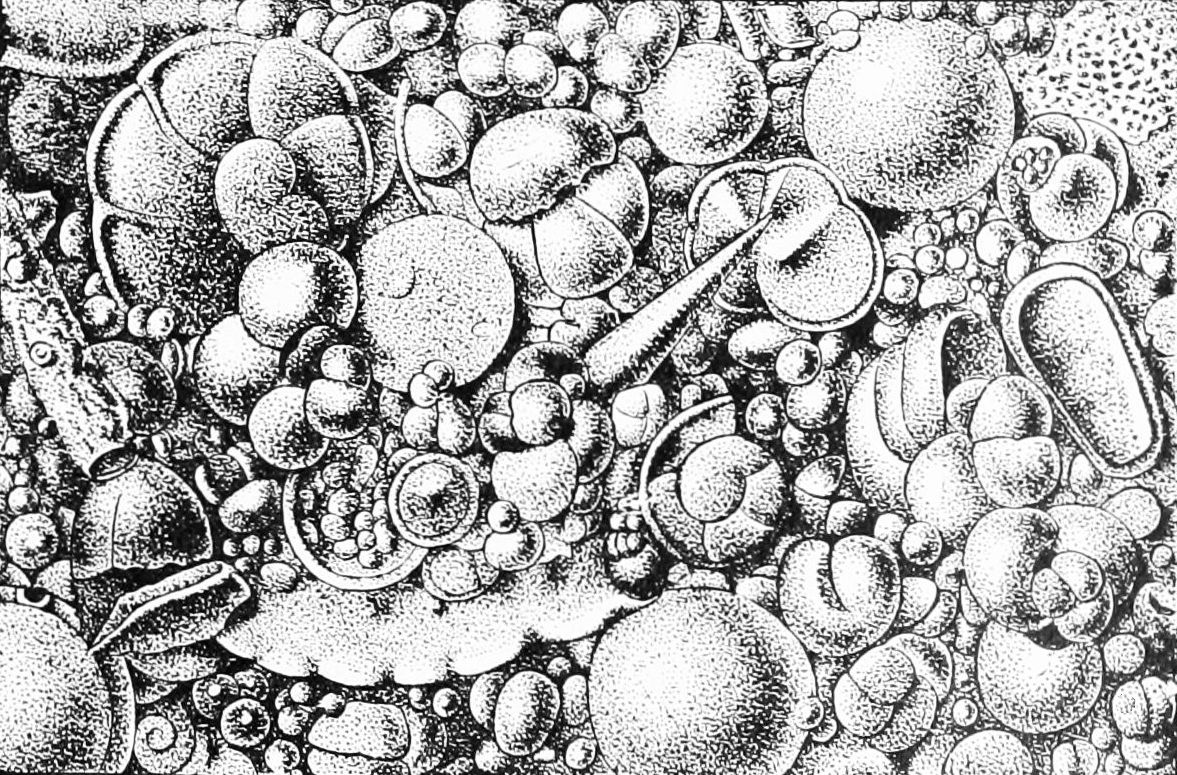
Illustration of a Globigerina ooze

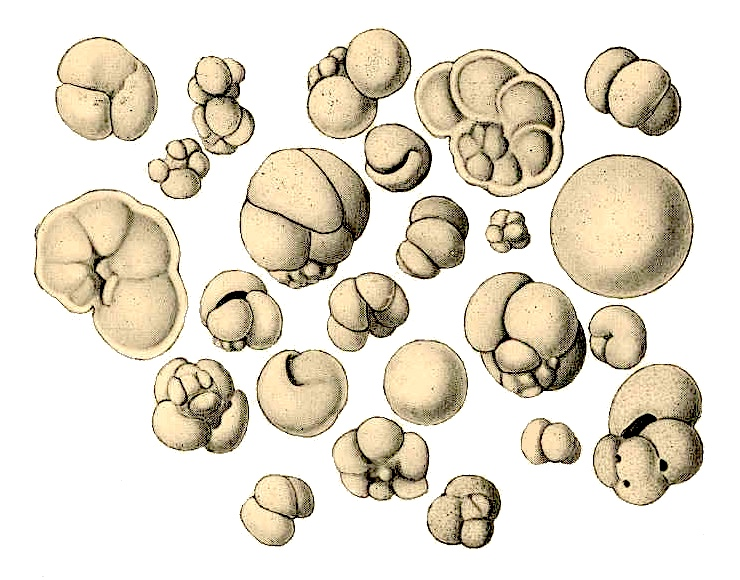
Shells (tests), usually made of calcium carbonate, from a foraminiferal ooze on the deep ocean floor

=== Lithified sediments ===
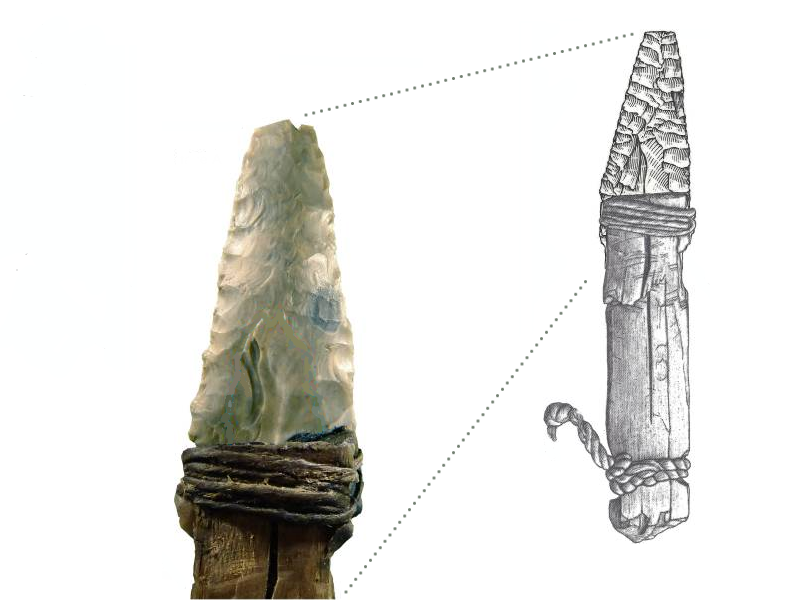
Stone dagger of Ötzi the Iceman who lived during the Copper Age. The blade is made of chert containing radiolarians, calcispheres, calpionellids and a few sponge spicules. The presence of calpionellids, which are extinct, was used to date this dagger.

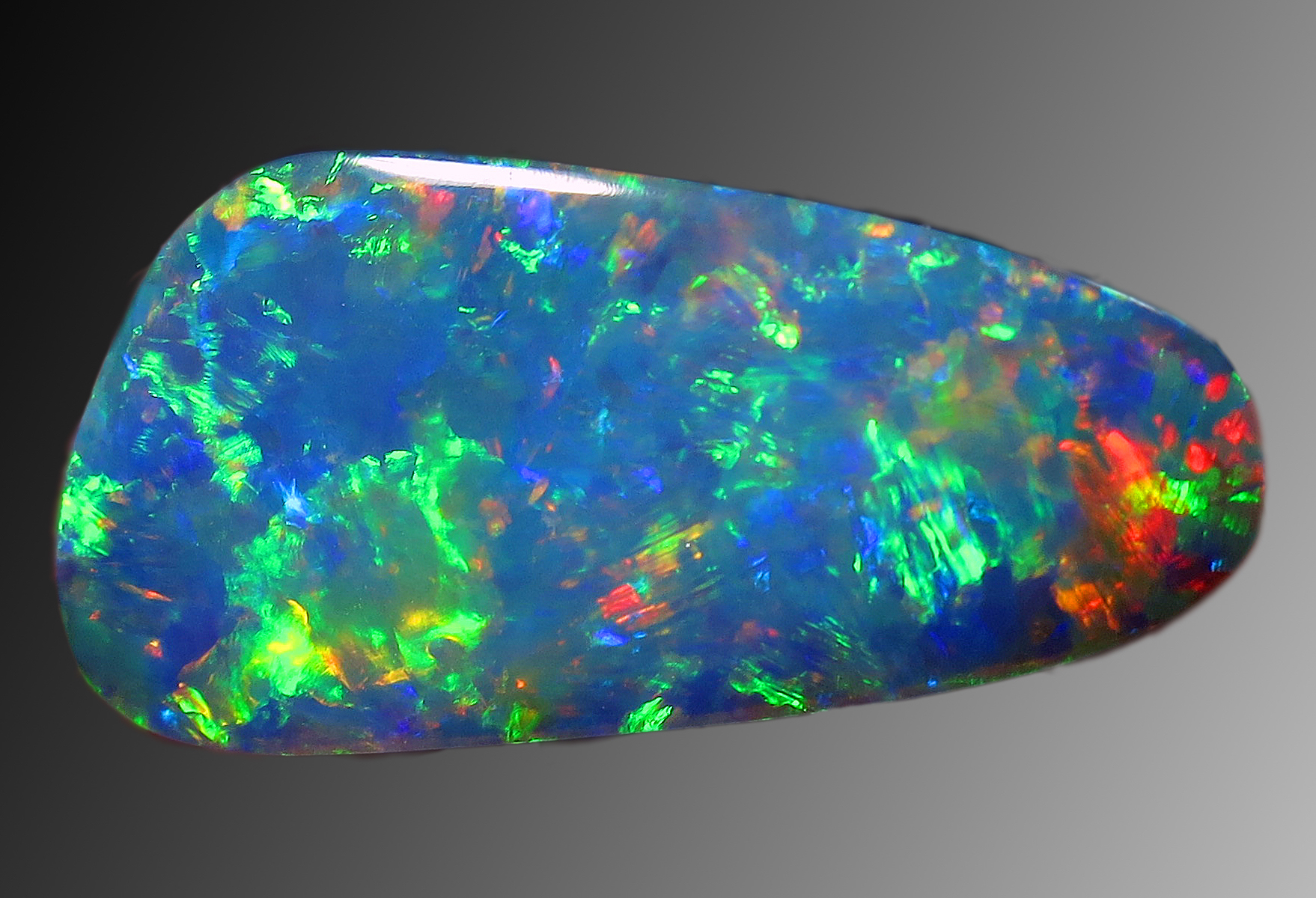
Opal can contain protist microfossils of diatoms, radiolarians, silicoflagellates and ebridians

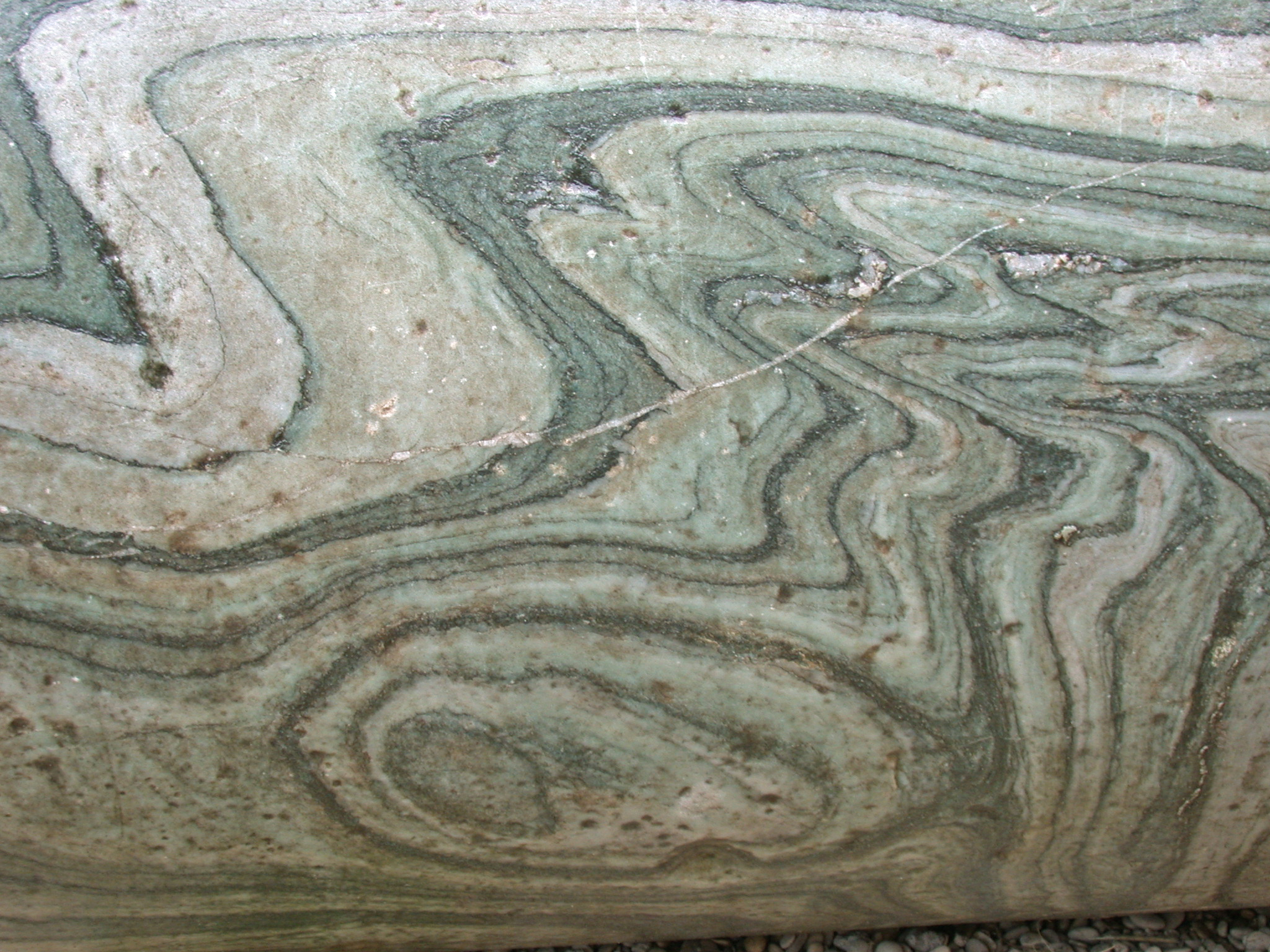
Marble can contain protist microfossils of foraminiferans, coccolithophores, calcareous nannoplankton and algae, ostracodes, pteropods, calpionellids and bryozoa

Carbonate-silicate cycle

== Distribution ==
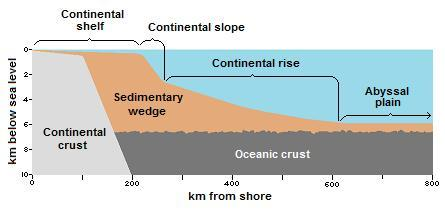

Where and how sediments accumulate will depend on the amount of material coming from a source, the distance from the source, the amount of time that sediment has had to accumulate, how well the sediments are preserved, and the amounts of other types of sediments that are also being added to the system.

Rates of sediment accumulation are relatively slow throughout most of the ocean, in many cases taking thousands of years for any significant deposits to form. Lithogenous sediment accumulates the fastest, on the order of one metre or more per thousand years for coarser particles. However, sedimentation rates near the mouths of large rivers with high discharge can be orders of magnitude higher.

Biogenous oozes accumulate at a rate of about 1 cm per thousand years, while small clay particles are deposited in the deep ocean at around one millimetre per thousand years. As described above, manganese nodules have an incredibly slow rate of accumulation, gaining 0.001 millimetres per thousand years.

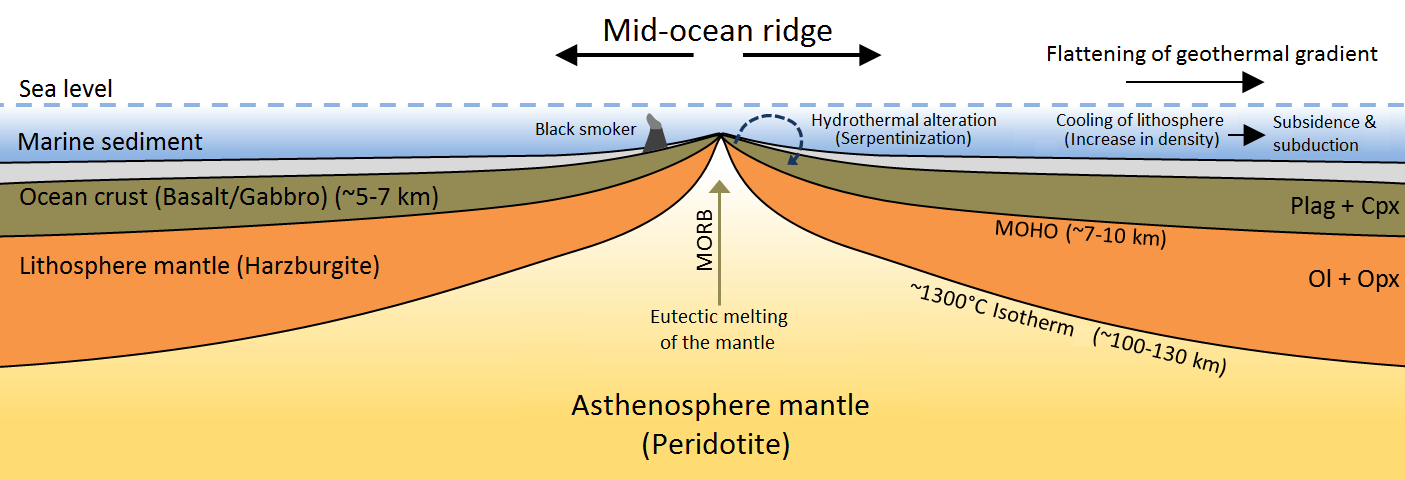

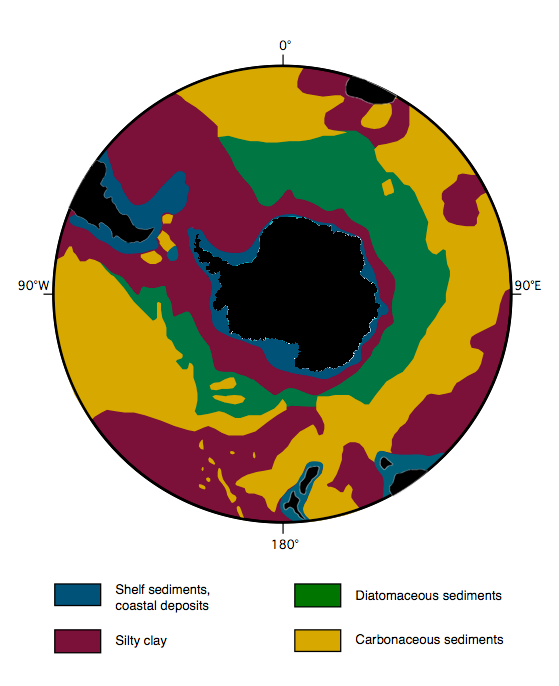
Southern-ocean sediment

Magma rising from a chamber below the mid-ocean ridge forms new ocean crust that spreads away from the ridge

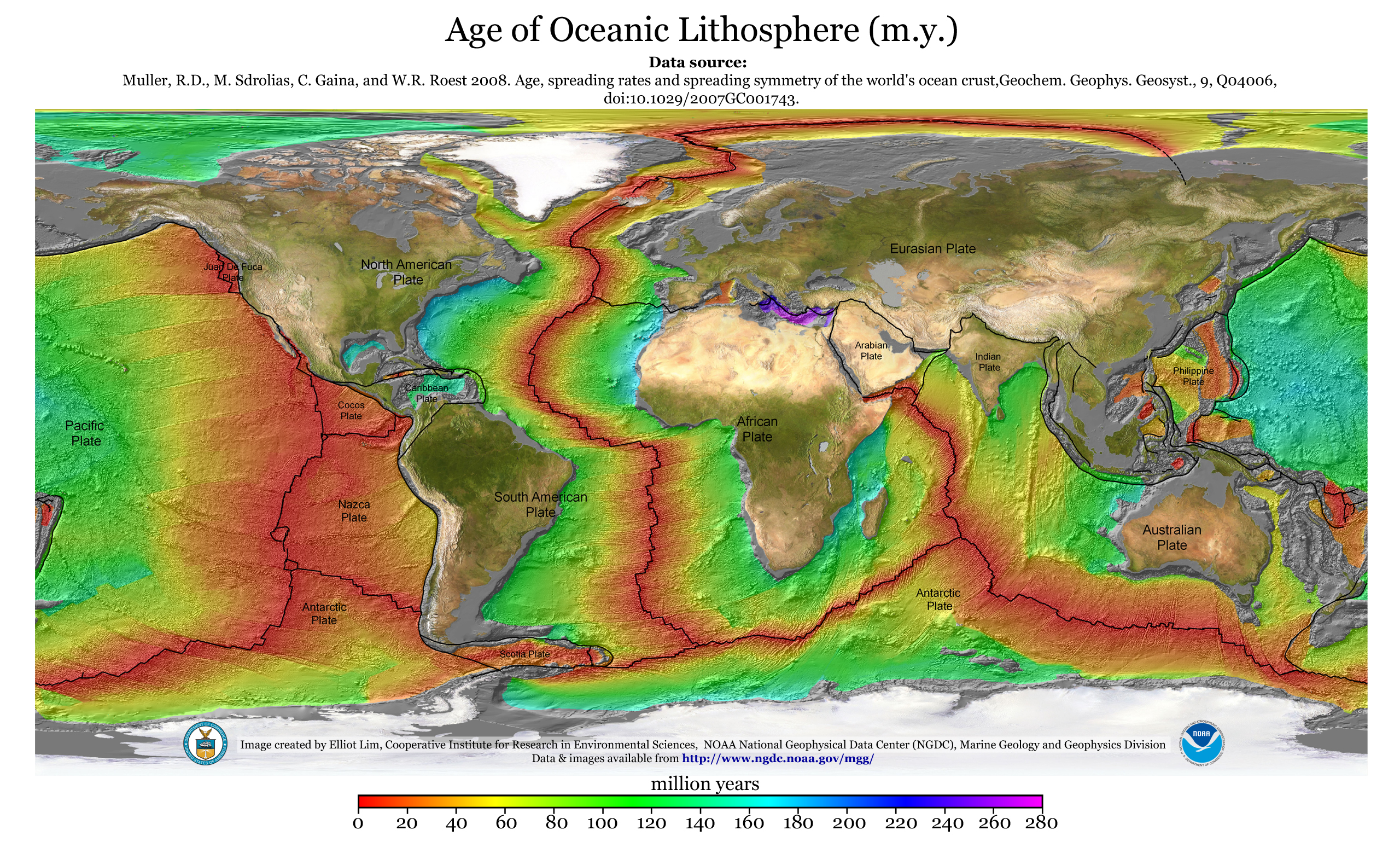
Age of the ocean crust In this diagram the youngest parts of the ocean crust are coloured red. These young parts are found either side of the mid-ocean ridge. New crust emerges and spreads out from this ridge, which traverses central parts of the ocean.

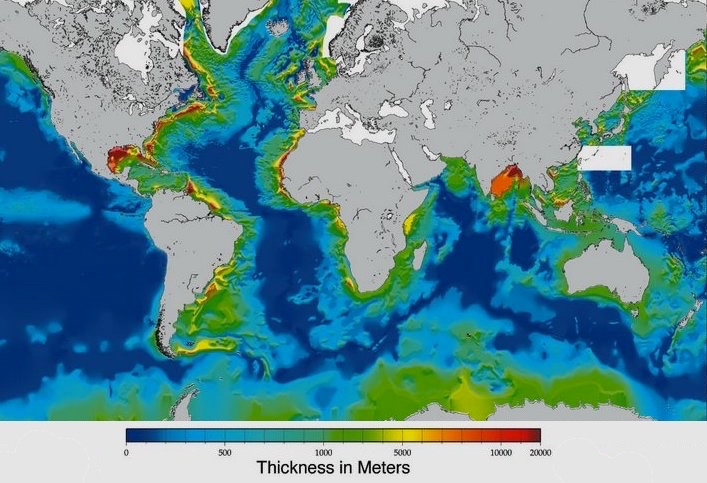
Thickness of marine sediments The sediments sit on top of the ocean crust, and are thick (green and yellow) along the continental shelves and down the continental slopes. They are at their thinnest (dark blue) near and along the mid-ocean ridge.

Marine sediments are thickest near the continental margins where they can be over 10 km thick. This is because the crust near passive continental margins is often very old, allowing for a long period of accumulation, and because there is a large amount of terrigenous sediment input coming from the continents. Near mid-ocean ridge systems where new oceanic crust is being formed, sediments are thinner, as they have had less time to accumulate on the younger crust.

As distance increases from a ridge spreading center the sediments get progressively thicker, increasing by approximately 100–200 m of sediment for every 1000 km distance from the ridge axis. With a seafloor spreading rate of about 20–40 km/million years, this represents a sediment accumulation rate of approximately 100–200 m every 25–50 million years.

The diagram at the start of this article ↑ shows the distribution of the major types of sediment on the ocean floor. Cosmogenous sediments could potentially end up in any part of the ocean, but they accumulate in such small abundances that they are overwhelmed by other sediment types and thus are not dominant in any location. Similarly, hydrogenous sediments can have high concentrations in specific locations, but these regions are very small on a global scale. So cosmogenous and hydrogenous sediments can mostly be ignored in the discussion of global sediment patterns.

Coarse lithogenous/terrigenous sediments are dominant near the continental margins as land runoff, river discharge, and other processes deposit vast amounts of these materials on the continental shelf. Much of this sediment remains on or near the shelf, while turbidity currents can transport material down the continental slope to the deep ocean floor (abyssal plain). Lithogenous sediment is also common at the poles where thick ice cover can limit primary production, and glacial breakup deposits sediments along the ice edge.

Coarse lithogenous sediments are less common in the central ocean, as these areas are too far from the sources for these sediments to accumulate. Very small clay particles are the exception, and as described below, they can accumulate in areas that other lithogenous sediment will not reach.

The distribution of biogenous sediments depends on their rates of production, dissolution, and dilution by other sediments. Coastal areas display very high primary production, so abundant biogenous deposits might be expected in these regions. However, sediment must be >30% biogenous to be considered a biogenous ooze, and even in productive coastal areas there is so much lithogenous input that it swamps the biogenous materials, and that 30% threshold is not reached. So coastal areas remain dominated by lithogenous sediment, and biogenous sediments will be more abundant in pelagic environments where there is little lithogenous input.

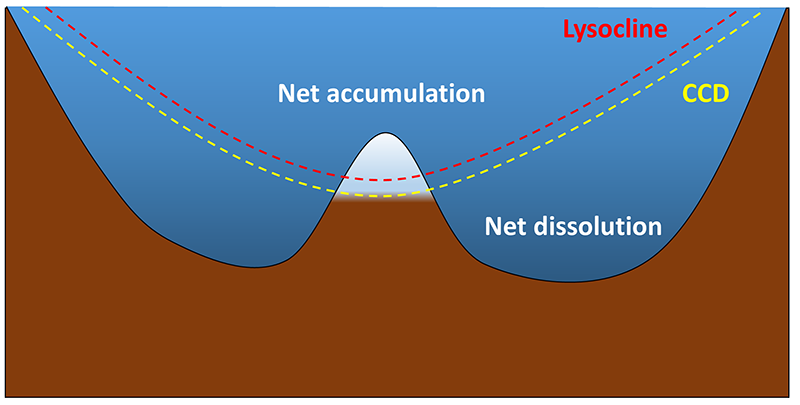
Calcareous sediment can only accumulate in depths shallower than the calcium carbonate compensation depth (CCD). Below the CCD, calcareous sediments dissolve and will not accumulate. The lysocline represents the depths where the rate of dissolution increases dramatically.

In order for biogenous sediments to accumulate their rate of production must be greater than the rate at which the tests dissolve. Silica is undersaturated throughout the ocean and will dissolve in seawater, but it dissolves more readily in warmer water and lower pressures; that is, it dissolves faster near the surface than in deep water. Silica sediments will therefore only accumulate in cooler regions of high productivity where they accumulate faster than they dissolve. This includes upwelling regions near the equator and at high latitudes where there are abundant nutrients and cooler water.

Oozes formed near the equatorial regions are usually dominated by radiolarians, while diatoms are more common in the polar oozes. Once the silica tests have settled on the bottom and are covered by subsequent layers, they are no longer subject to dissolution and the sediment will accumulate. Approximately 15% of the seafloor is covered by siliceous oozes.

Biogenous calcium carbonate sediments also require production to exceed dissolution for sediments to accumulate, but the processes involved are a little different than for silica. Calcium carbonate dissolves more readily in more acidic water. Cold seawater contains more dissolved CO_{2} and is slightly more acidic than warmer water. So calcium carbonate tests are more likely to dissolve in colder, deeper, polar water than in warmer, tropical, surface water. At the poles the water is uniformly cold, so calcium carbonate readily dissolves at all depths, and carbonate sediments do not accumulate. In temperate and tropical regions calcium carbonate dissolves more readily as it sinks into deeper water.

The depth at which calcium carbonate dissolves as fast as it accumulates is called the calcium carbonate compensation depth or calcite compensation depth, or simply the CCD. The lysocline represents the depths where the rate of calcium carbonate dissolution increases dramatically (similar to the thermocline and halocline). At depths shallower than the CCD carbonate accumulation will exceed the rate of dissolution, and carbonate sediments will be deposited. In areas deeper than the CCD, the rate of dissolution will exceed production, and no carbonate sediments can accumulate (see diagram at right). The CCD is usually found at depths of 4 – 4.5 km, although it is much shallower at the poles where the surface water is cold. Thus calcareous oozes will mostly be found in tropical or temperate waters less than about 4 km deep, such as along the mid-ocean ridge systems and atop seamounts and plateaus.

The CCD is deeper in the Atlantic than in the Pacific since the Pacific contains more CO_{2}, making the water more acidic and calcium carbonate more soluble. This, along with the fact that the Pacific is deeper, means that the Atlantic contains more calcareous sediment than the Pacific. All told, about 48% of the seafloor is dominated by calcareous oozes.

Much of the rest of the deep ocean floor (about 38%) is dominated by abyssal clays. This is not so much a result of an abundance of clay formation, but rather the lack of any other types of sediment input. The clay particles are mostly of terrestrial origin, but because they are so small they are easily dispersed by wind and currents, and can reach areas inaccessible to other sediment types. Clays dominate in the central North Pacific, for example. This area is too far from land for coarse lithogenous sediment to reach, it is not productive enough for biogenous tests to accumulate, and it is too deep for calcareous materials to reach the bottom before dissolving.

Because clay particles accumulate so slowly, the clay-dominated deep ocean floor is often home to hydrogenous sediments like manganese nodules. If any other type of sediment was produced here it would accumulate much more quickly and would bury the nodules before they had a chance to grow.

== Coastal sediments ==
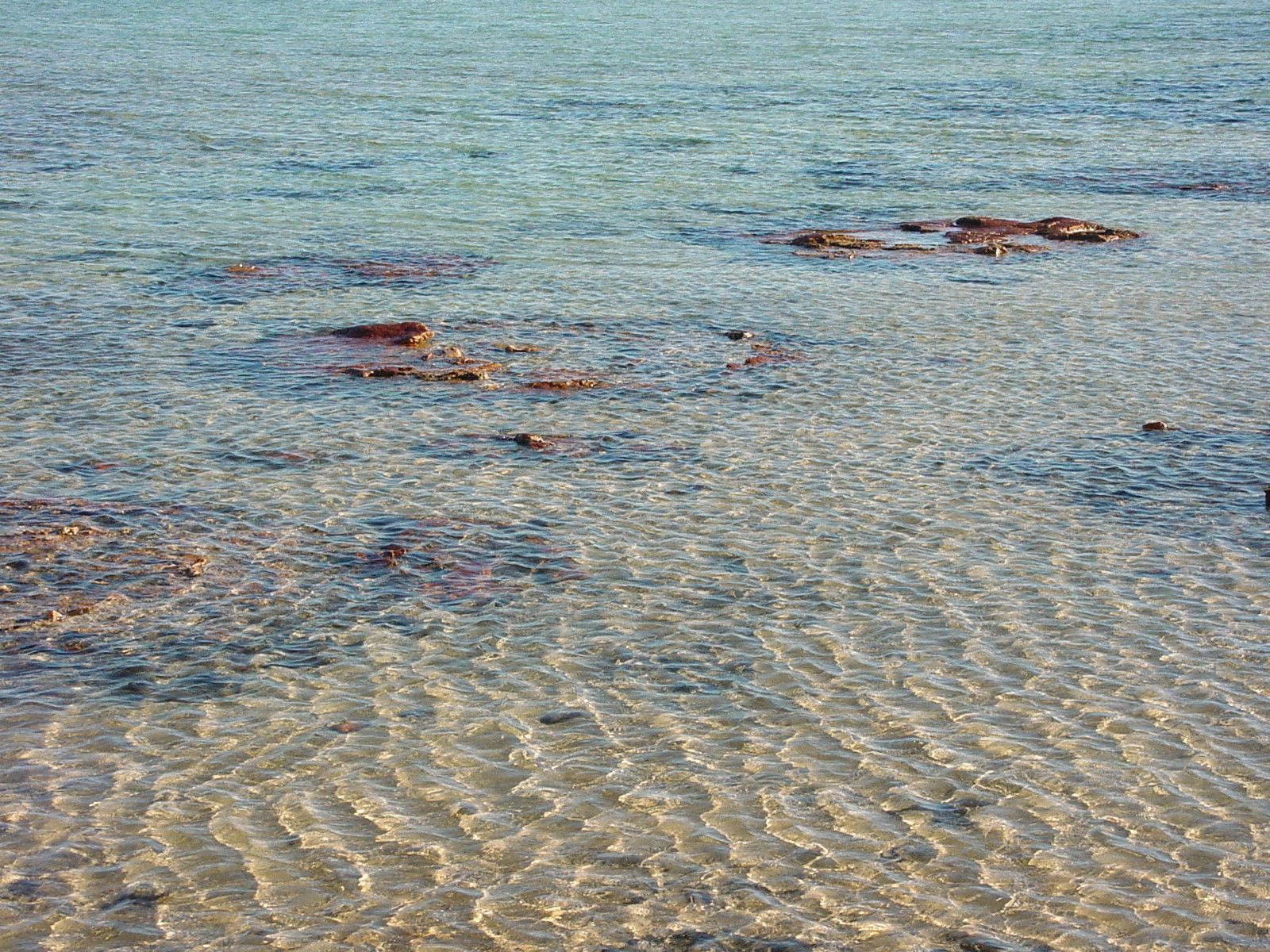
Shallow water

Shallow water marine environments are found in areas between the shore and deeper water, such as a reef wall or a shelf break. The water in this environment is shallow and clear, allowing the formation of different sedimentary structures, carbonate rocks, coral reefs, and allowing certain organisms to survive and become fossils.

The sediment itself is often composed of limestone, which forms readily in shallow, warm calm waters. The shallow marine environments are not exclusively composed of siliciclastic or carbonaceous sediments. While they cannot always coexist, it is possible to have a shallow marine environment composed solely of carbonaceous sediment or one that is composed completely of siliciclastic sediment. Shallow water marine sediment is made up of larger grain sizes because smaller grains have been washed out to deeper water. Within sedimentary rocks composed of carbonaceous sediment, there may also be evaporite minerals. The most common evaporite minerals found within modern and ancient deposits are gypsum, anhydrite, and halite; they can occur as crystalline layers, isolated crystals or clusters of crystals.

In terms of geologic time, it is said that most Phanerozoic sedimentary rock was deposited in shallow marine environments as about 75% of the sedimentary carapace is made up of shallow marine sediments; it is then assumed that Precambrian sedimentary rocks were too, deposited in shallow marine waters, unless it is specifically identified otherwise. This trend is seen in the North American and Caribbean region. Also, as a result of supercontinent breakup and other shifting tectonic plate processes, shallow marine sediment displays large variations in terms of quantity in the geologic time.

The drainage basins of the principal oceans and seas of the world are marked by continental divides. The grey areas are endorheic basins that do not drain to the ocean.

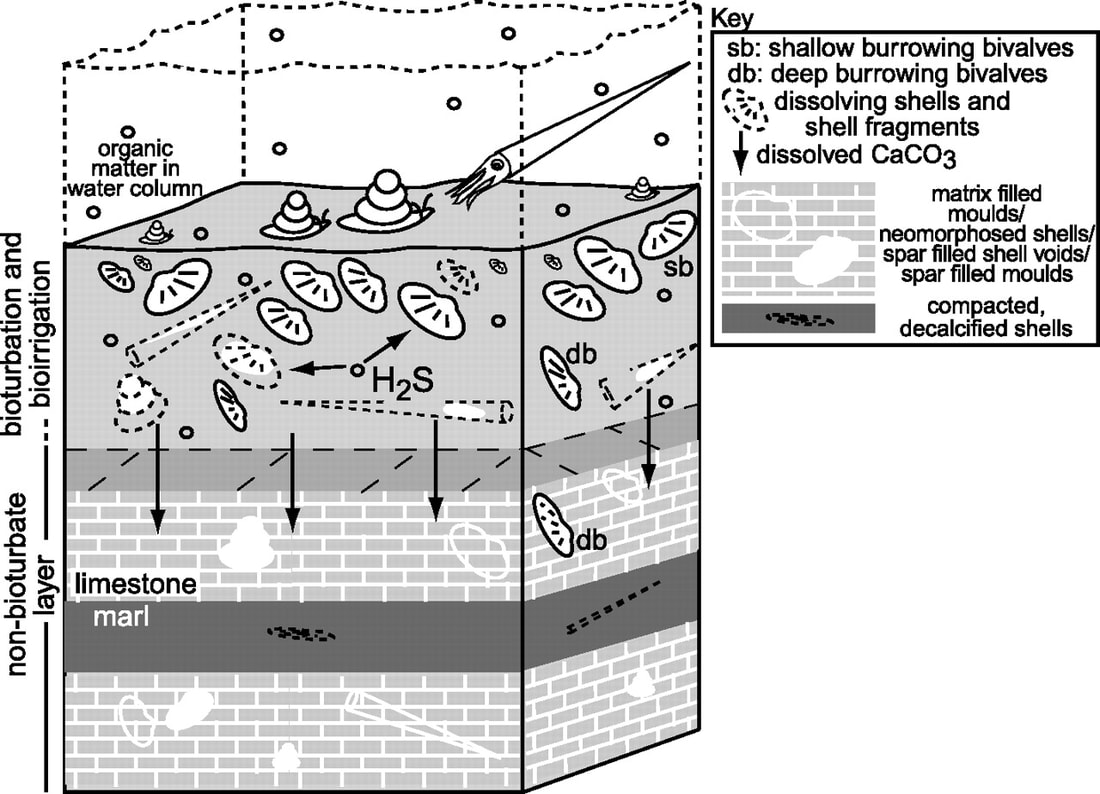
Bioturbation and bioirrigation in the sediment at the bottom of a coastal ecosystems

=== Bioturbation ===
Bioturbation is the reworking of sediment by animals or plants. These include burrowing, ingestion, and defecation of sediment grains. Bioturbating activities have a profound effect on the environment and are thought to be a primary driver of biodiversity. The formal study of bioturbation began in the 1800s by Charles Darwin experimenting in his garden. The disruption of aquatic sediments and terrestrial soils through bioturbating activities provides significant ecosystem services. These include the alteration of nutrients in aquatic sediment and overlying water, shelter to other species in the form of burrows in terrestrial and water ecosystems, and soil production on land.

Bioturbators are ecosystem engineers because they alter resource availability to other species through the physical changes they make to their environments. This type of ecosystem change affects the evolution of cohabitating species and the environment, which is evident in trace fossils left in marine and terrestrial sediments. Other bioturbation effects include altering the texture of sediments (diagenesis), bioirrigation, and displacement of microorganisms and non-living particles. Bioturbation is sometimes confused with the process of bioirrigation, however these processes differ in what they are mixing; bioirrigation refers to the mixing of water and solutes in sediments and is an effect of bioturbation

Walruses and salmon are examples of large bioturbators. Although the activities of these large macrofaunal bioturbators are more conspicuous, the dominant bioturbators are small invertebrates, such as polychaetes, ghost shrimp and mud shrimp. The activities of these small invertebrates, which include burrowing and ingestion and defecation of sediment grains, contribute to mixing and the alteration of sediment structure.

=== Bioirrigation ===
Bioirrigation is the process of benthic organisms flushing their burrows with overlying water. The exchange of dissolved substances between the porewater and overlying seawater that results is an important process in the context of the biogeochemistry of the oceans. Coastal aquatic environments often have organisms that destabilize sediment. They change the physical state of the sediment. Thus improving the conditions for other organisms and themselves. These organisms often also cause Bioturbation, which is commonly used interchangeably or in reference with bioirrigation.

Bioirrigation works as two different processes. These processes are known as particle reworking and ventilation, which is the work of benthic macro-invertebrates (usually ones that burrow). This particle reworking and ventilation is caused by the organisms when they feed (faunal feeding), defecate, burrow, and respire. Bioirrigation is responsible for a large amount of oxidative transport and has a large impact on biogeochemical cycles.

== Pelagic sediments ==
Pelagic and hemipelagic processes

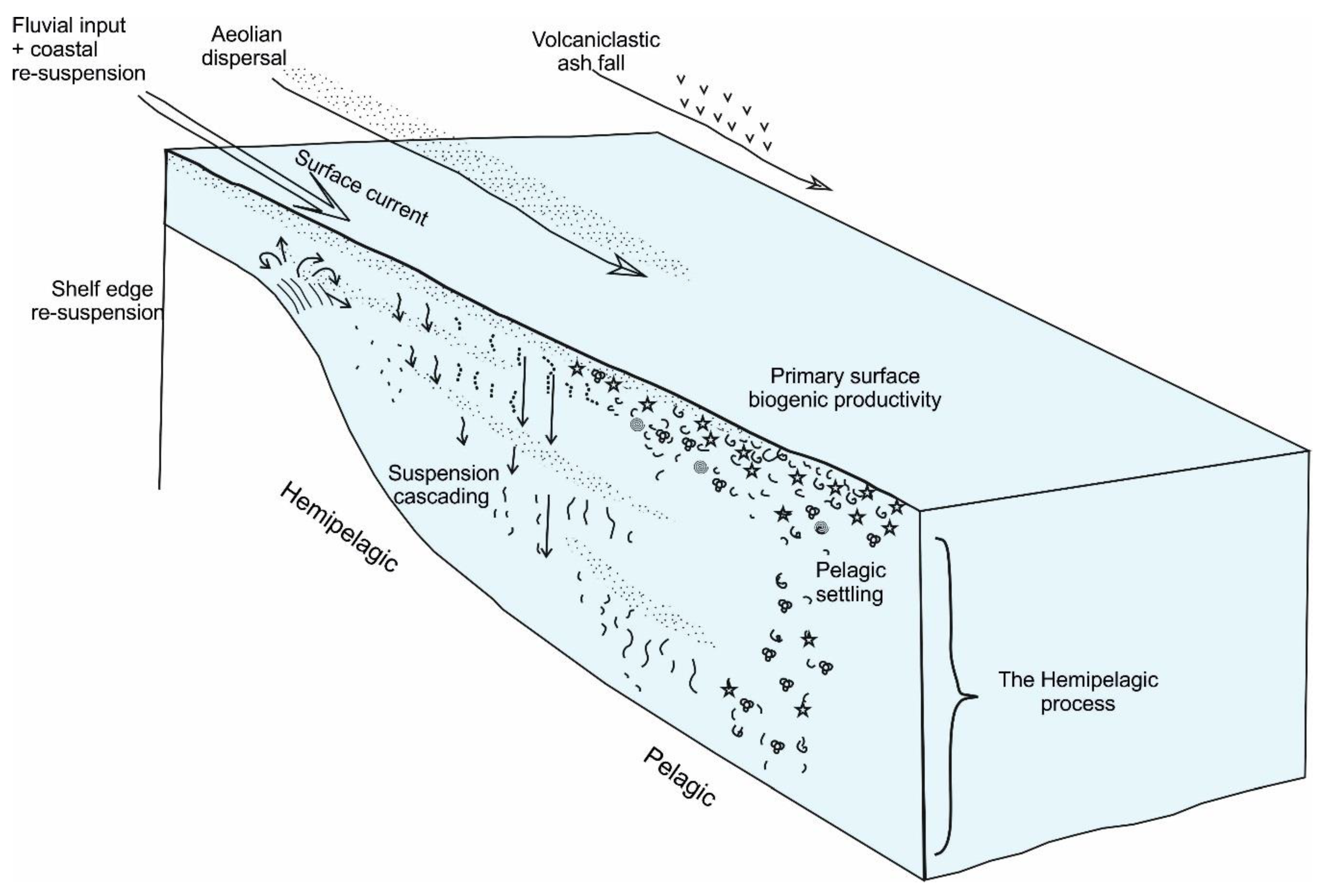
Sediment supply from terrigenous and biological sources
as well as its dispersion and settling through the water column

Pelagic sediments, or pelagite, are fine-grained sediments that accumulate as the result of the settling of particles to the floor of the open ocean, far from land. These particles consist primarily of either the microscopic, calcareous or siliceous shells of phytoplankton or zooplankton; clay-size siliciclastic sediment; or some mixture of these. Trace amounts of meteoric dust and variable amounts of volcanic ash also occur within pelagic sediments. Based upon the composition of the ooze, there are three main types of pelagic sediments: siliceous oozes, calcareous oozes, and red clays.

An extensive body of work on deep-water processes and sediments has been built over the past 150 years since the voyage of HMS Challenger (1872–1876), during which the first systematic study of seafloor sediments was made. For many decades since that pioneering expedition, and through the first half of the twentieth century, the deep sea was considered entirely pelagic in nature.

The composition of pelagic sediments is controlled by three main factors. The first factor is the distance from major landmasses, which affects their dilution by terrigenous, or land-derived, sediment. The second factor is water depth, which affects the preservation of both siliceous and calcareous biogenic particles as they settle to the ocean bottom. The final factor is ocean fertility, which controls the amount of biogenic particles produced in surface waters.

=== Turbidites ===
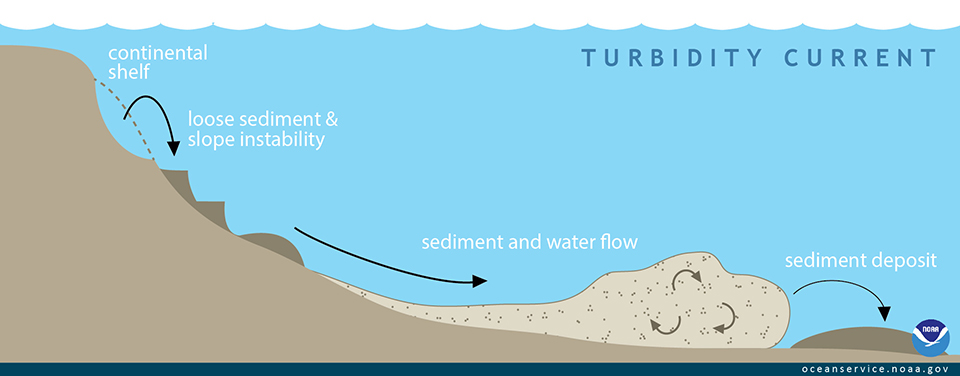
Continental margins can experience slope failures triggered by earthquakes or other geological disturbances. These can result in turbidity currents as turbid water dense with suspended sediment rushes down the slope. Chaotic motion within the sediment flow can sustain the turbidity current, and once it reaches the deep abyssal plain it can flow for hundreds of kilometres.

Turbidites are the geologic deposits of a turbidity current, which is a type of amalgamation of fluidal and sediment gravity flow responsible for distributing vast amounts of clastic sediment into the deep ocean. Turbidites are deposited in the deep ocean troughs below the continental shelf, or similar structures in deep lakes, by underwater avalanches which slide down the steep slopes of the continental shelf edge. When the material comes to rest in the ocean trough, it is the sand and other coarse material which settles first followed by mud and eventually the very fine particulate matter. This sequence of deposition creates the Bouma sequences that characterize these rocks.

Turbidites were first recognised in the 1950s and the first facies model was developed by Bouma in 1962. Since that time, turbidites have been one of the better known and most intensively studied deep-water sediment facies. They are now very well known from sediment cores recovered from modern deep-water systems, subsurface (hydrocarbon) boreholes and ancient outcrops now exposed on land. Each new study of a particular turbidite system reveals specific deposit characteristics and facies for that system. The most commonly observed facies have been variously synthesised into a range of facies schemes.

=== Contourites ===
Ocean bottom (contour) current

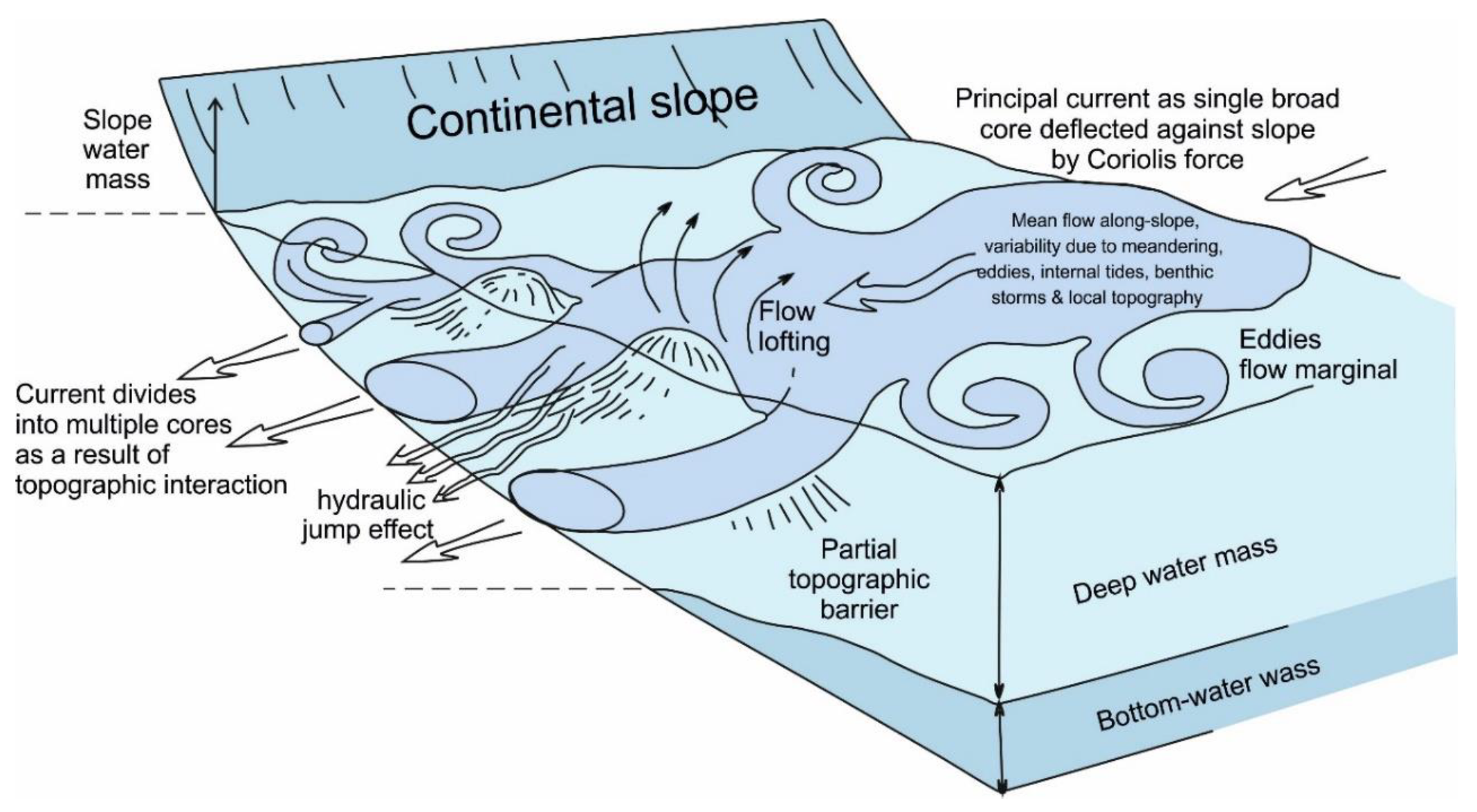
Identifying the current core, eddies and strands within a deep-water mass

A contourite is a sedimentary deposit commonly formed on continental rise to lower slope settings, although they may occur anywhere that is below storm wave base. Countourites are produced by thermohaline-induced deepwater bottom currents and may be influenced by wind or tidal forces. The geomorphology of contourite deposits is mainly influenced by the deepwater bottom-current velocity, sediment supply, and seafloor topography.

Contourites were first identified in the early 1960s by Bruce Heezen and co-workers at Woods Hole Oceanographic Institute. Their now seminal paper demonstrated the very significant effects of contour-following bottom currents in shaping sedimentation on the deep continental rise off eastern North America. The deposits of these semi-permanent alongslope currents soon became known as contourites, and the demarcation of slope-parallel, elongate and mounded sediment bodies made up largely of contourites became known as contourite drifts.

=== Hemipelagic ===
Hemipelagic sediments, or hemipelagite, are a type of marine sediments that consists of clay and silt-sized grains that are terrigenous and some biogenic material derived from the landmass nearest the deposits or from organisms living in the water. Hemipelagic sediments are deposited on continental shelves and continental rises, and differ from pelagic sediment compositionally. Pelagic sediment is composed of primarily biogenic material from organisms living in the water column or on the seafloor and contains little to no terrigenous material. Terrigenous material includes minerals from the lithosphere like feldspar or quartz. Volcanism on land, wind blown sediments as well as particulates discharged from rivers can contribute to Hemipelagic deposits. These deposits can be used to qualify climatic changes and identify changes in sediment provenances.

Diagrams of pelagic sediment types

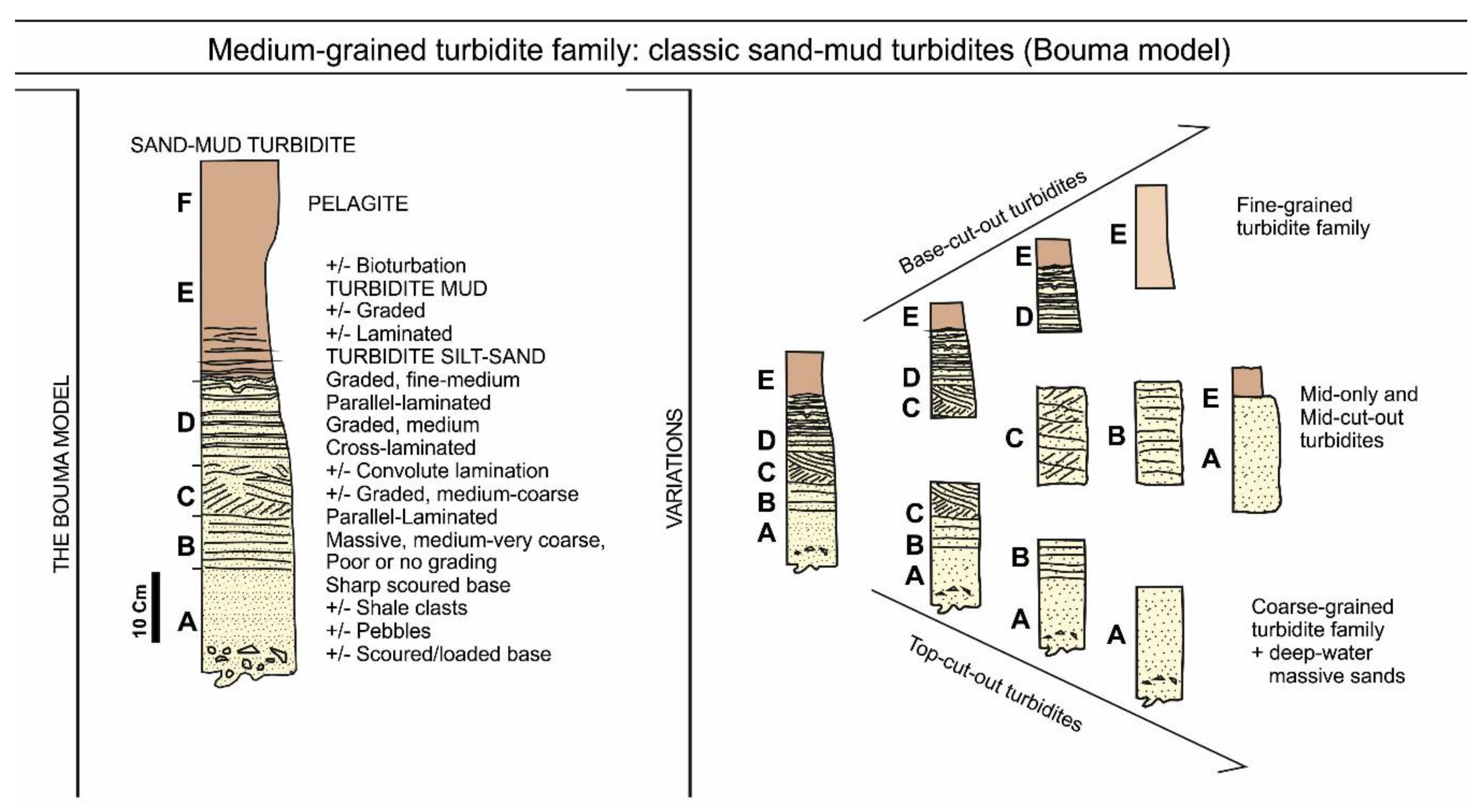
Medium-grained turbidite family
The ideal Bouma facies model showing the complete sequence of divisions A–E, while F is a typical partial sequence found in nature.

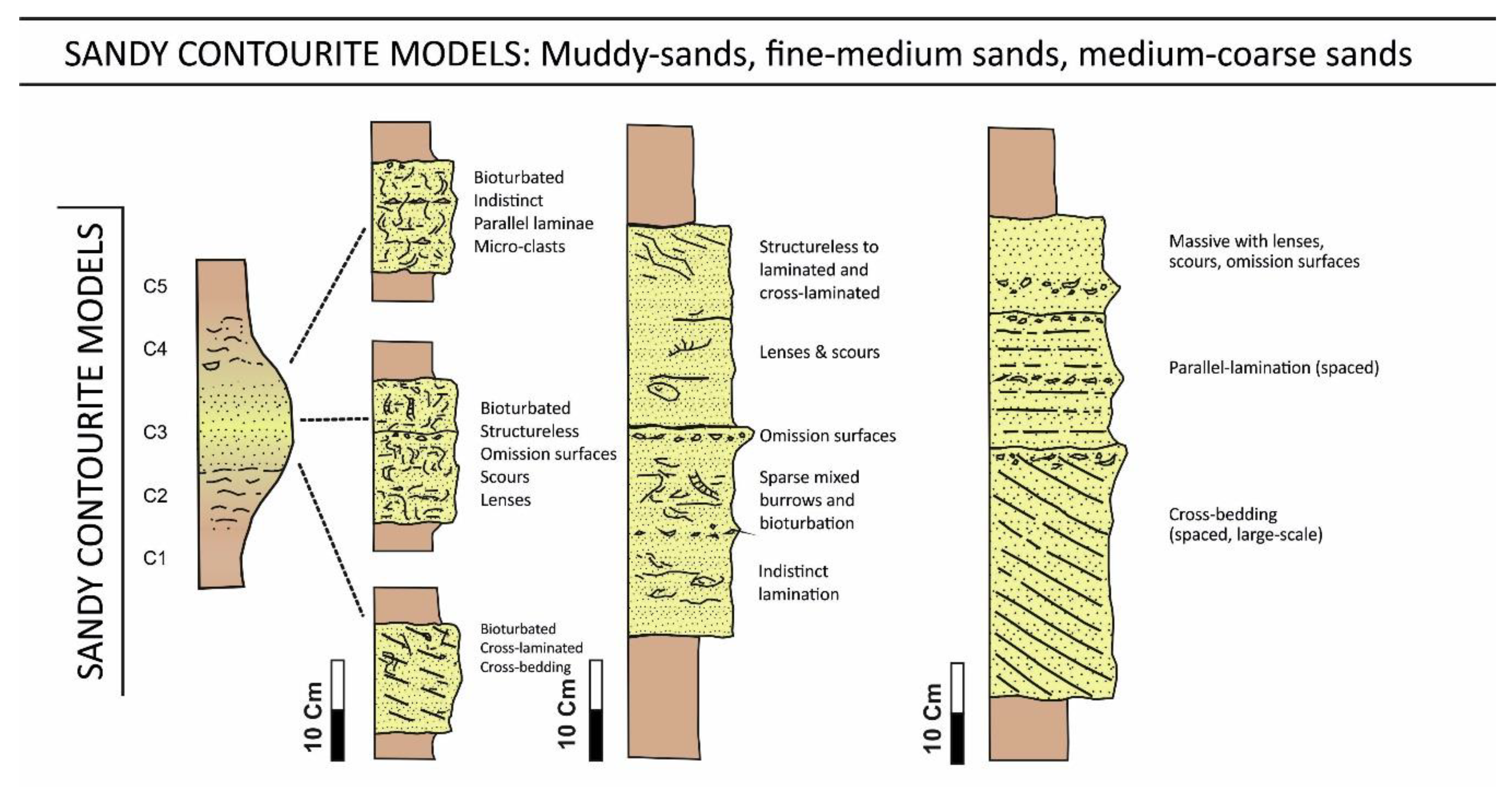
Sandy contourite family
for muddy sands, fine-to-medium sands
and medium-to-coarse sands

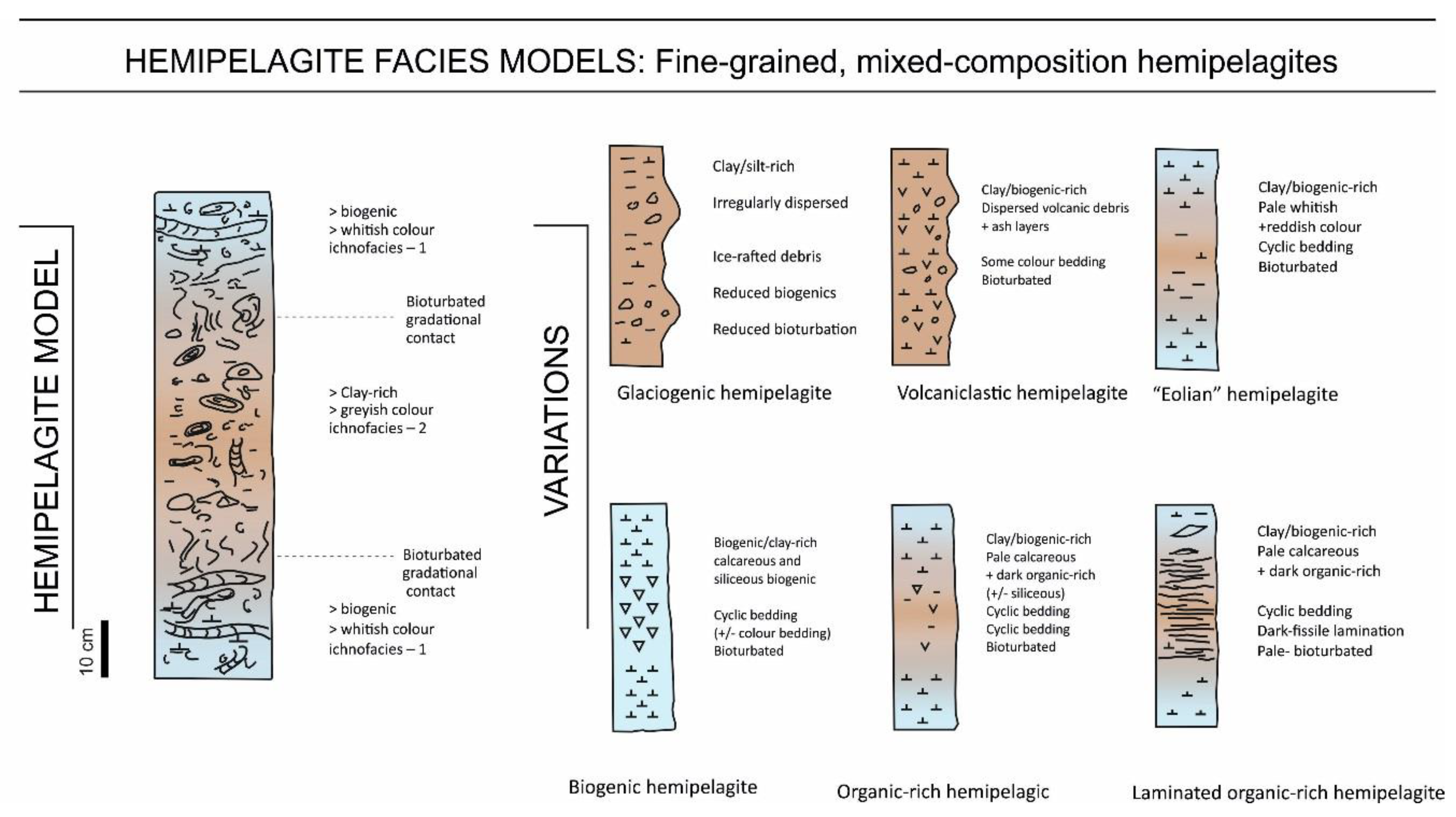
Hemipelagite facies models
Standard model showing simple cyclicity between clay-rich and biogenic-rich parts. Variations depend on component inputs.

== Ecology ==
Benthos (from Ancient Greek βένθος (bénthos) 'the depths (of the sea)') is the community of organisms that live on, in, or near the seafloor, also known as the benthic zone.

- Hyperbenthos (or hyperbenthic organisms), prefix from Ancient Greek hupér 'over', live just above the sediment.
- Epibenthos (or epibenthic organisms), prefix from Ancient Greek epí 'on top of', live on top of the sediments.
- Endobenthos (or endobenthic organisms), prefix from Ancient Greek éndon 'inner', live buried, or burrowing in the sediment, often in the oxygenated top layer.

=== Microbenthos ===
Marine microbenthos are microorganisms that live in the benthic zone of the ocean – that live near or on the seafloor, or within or on surface seafloor sediments. The word benthos comes from Greek, meaning "depth of the sea". Microbenthos are found everywhere on or about the seafloor of continental shelves, as well as in deeper waters, with greater diversity in or on seafloor sediments. In shallow waters, seagrass meadows, coral reefs and kelp forests provide particularly rich habitats. In photic zones benthic diatoms dominate as photosynthetic organisms. In intertidal zones changing tides strongly control opportunities for microbenthos.

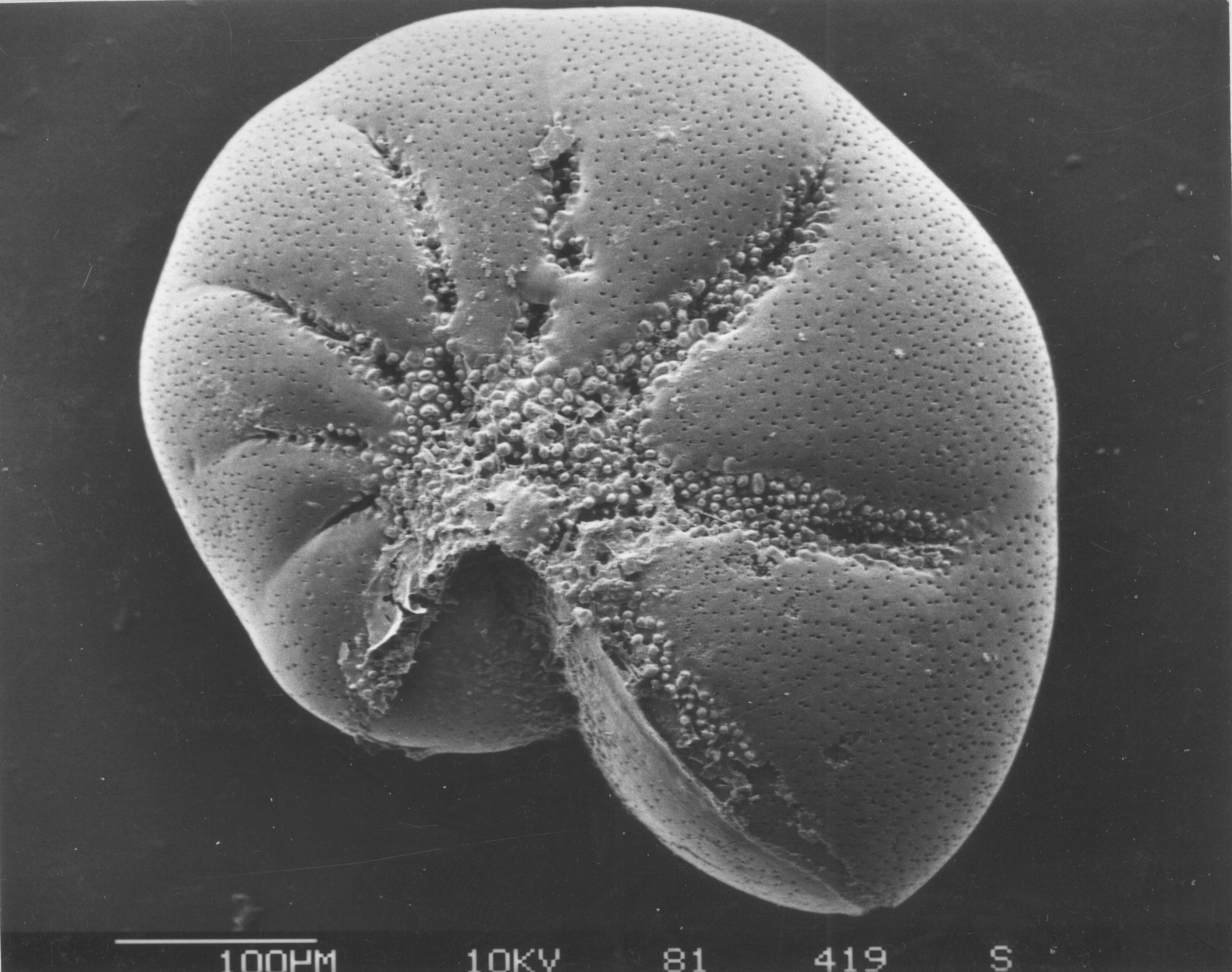
Elphidium a widespread abundant genus of benthic forams

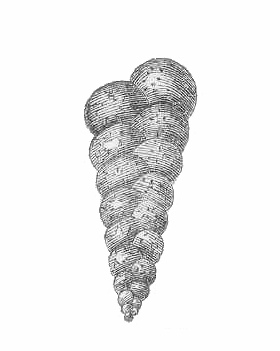
Heterohelix, an extinct genus of benthic forams
Marine microanimals

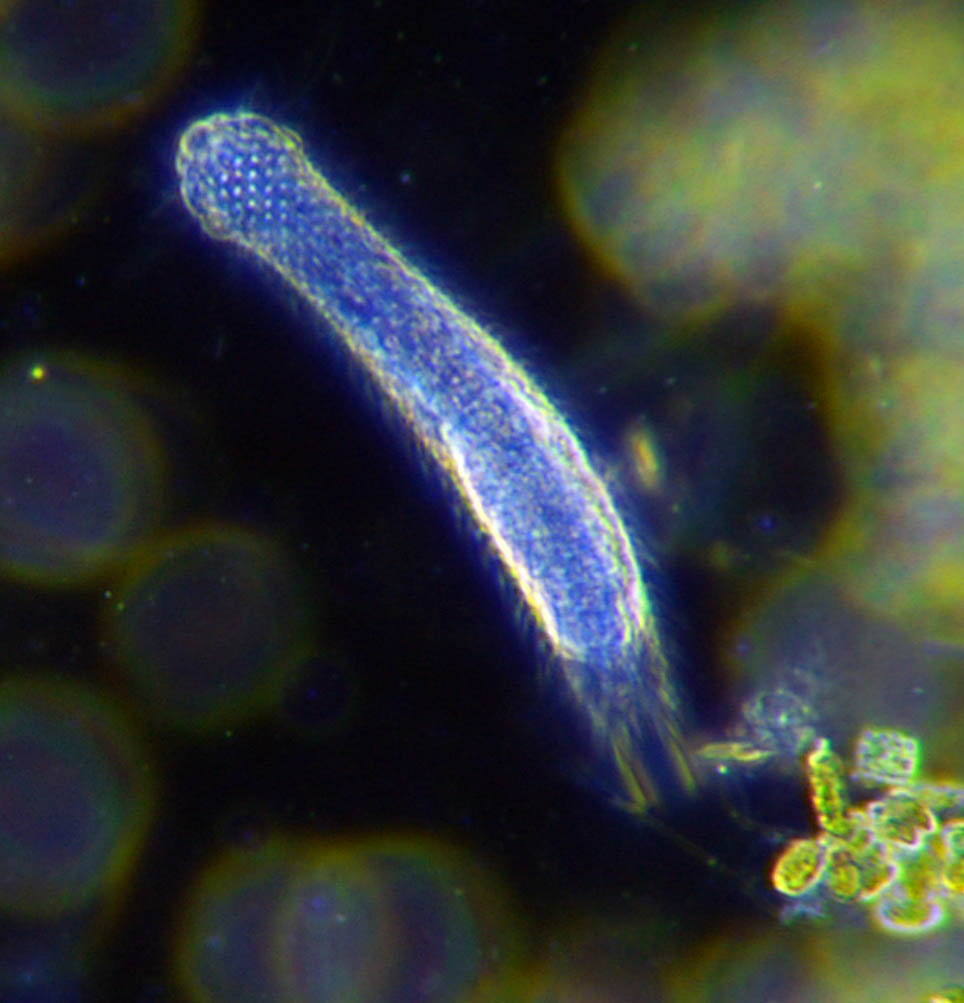
Darkfield photo of a gastrotrich, 0.06-3.0 mm long, a worm-like animal living between sediment particles

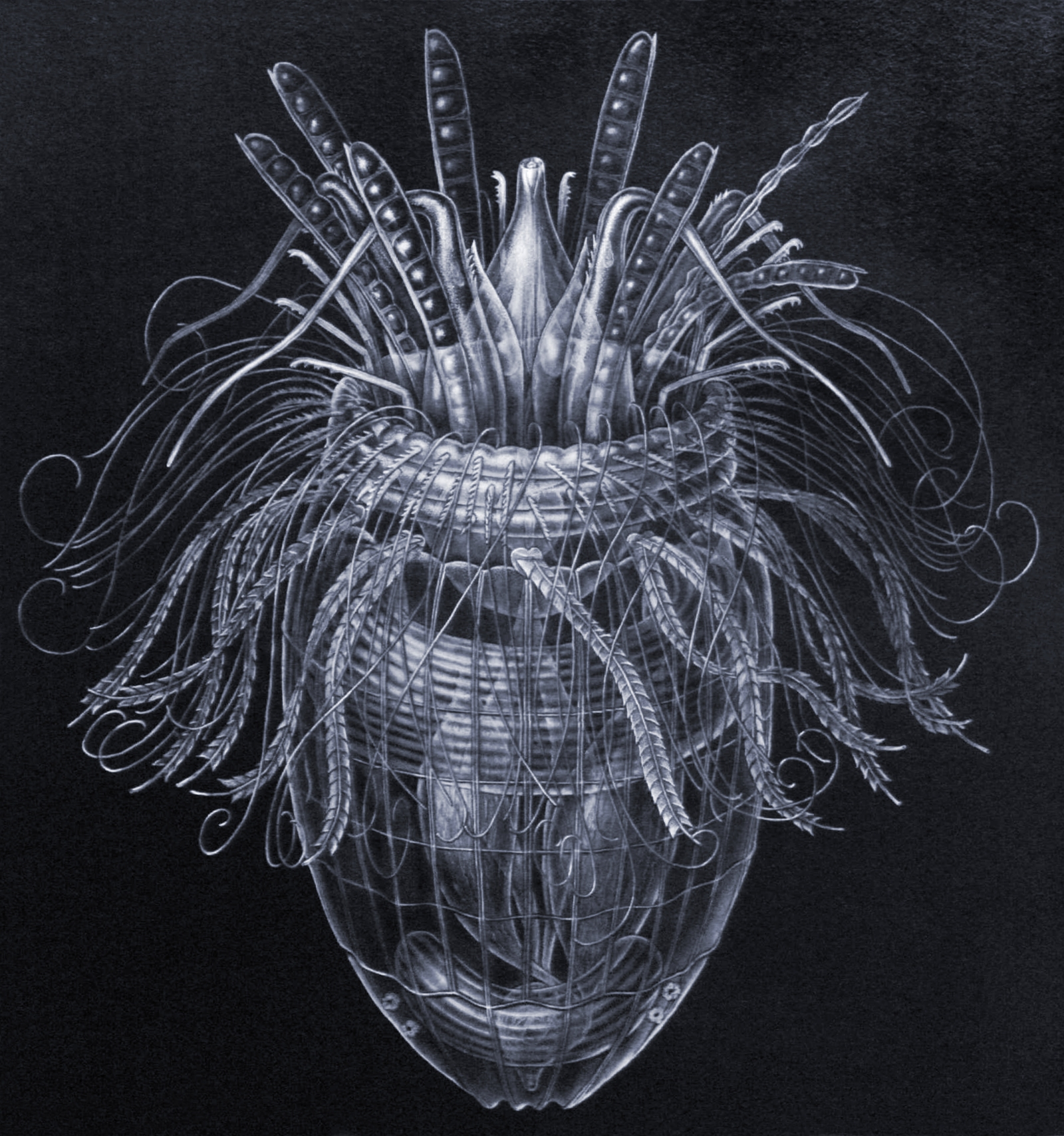
Armoured Pliciloricus enigmaticus, about 0.2 mm long, live in spaces between marine gravel

Diatoms form a (disputed) phylum containing about 100,000 recognised species of mainly unicellular algae. Diatoms generate about 20 per cent of the oxygen produced on the planet each year, take in over 6.7 billion metric tons of silicon each year from the waters in which they live, and contribute nearly half of the organic material found in the oceans.

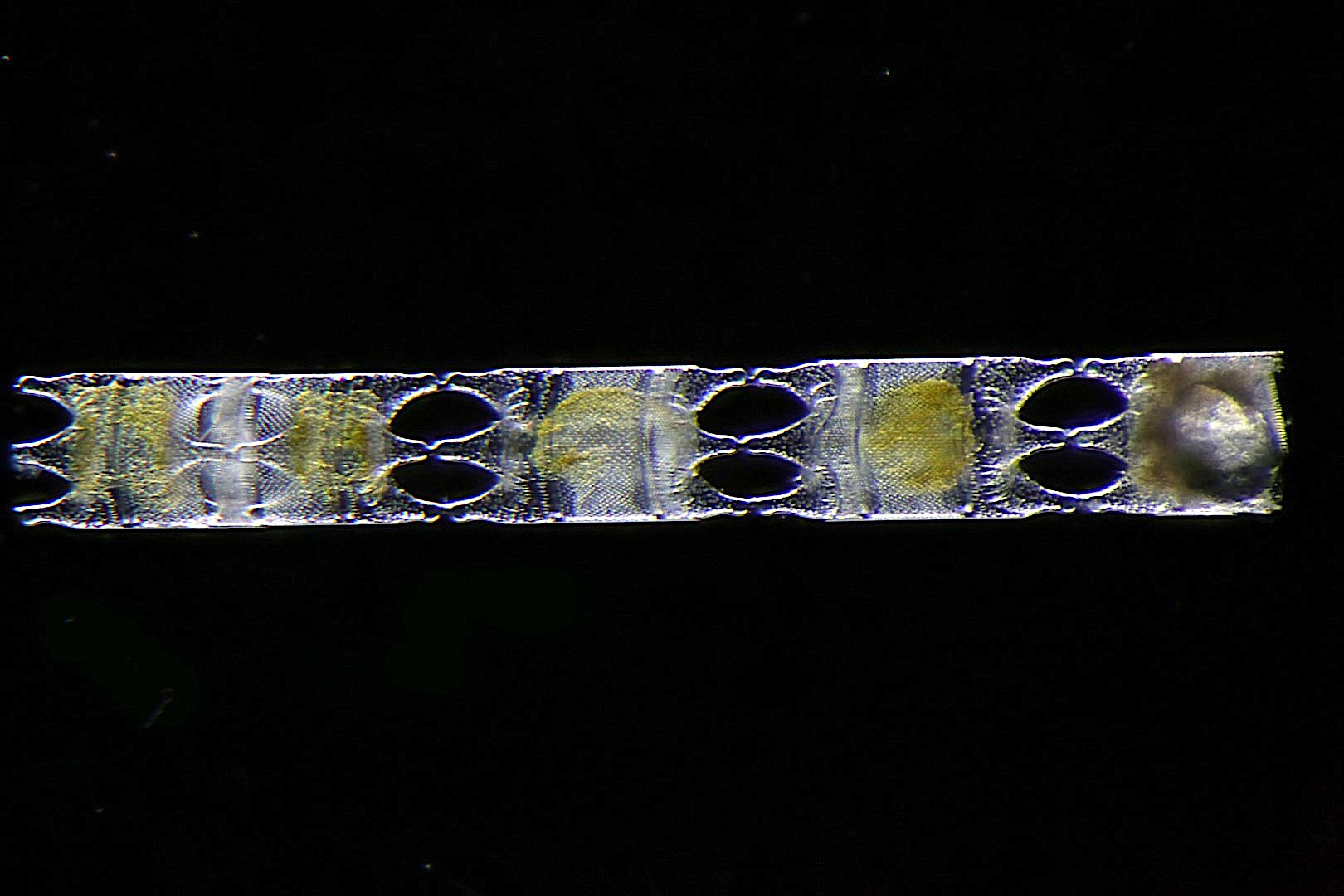
Benthic diatom

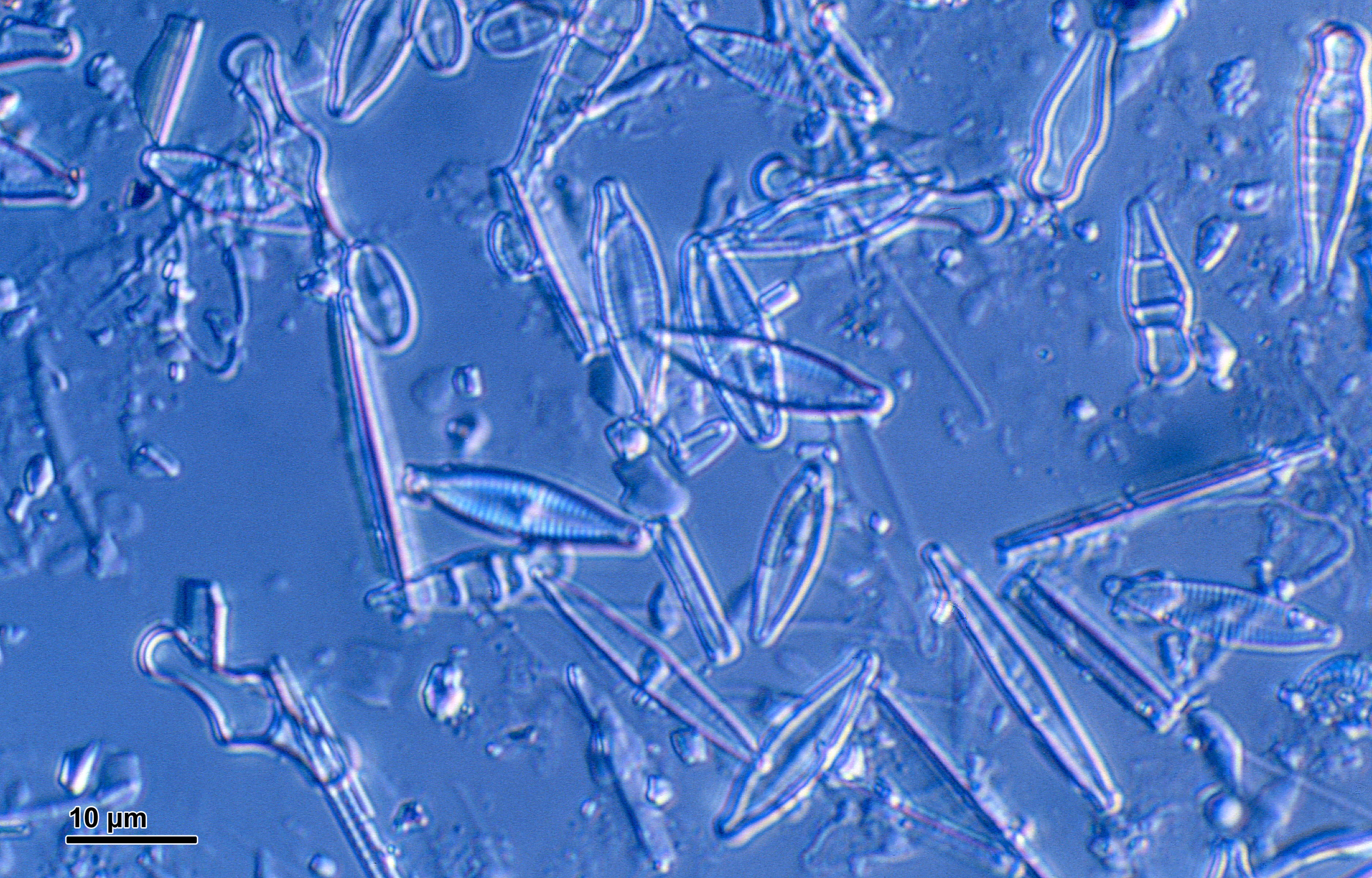
Diatoms are one of the most common types of phytoplankton

Their protective shells (frustles) are made of silicon

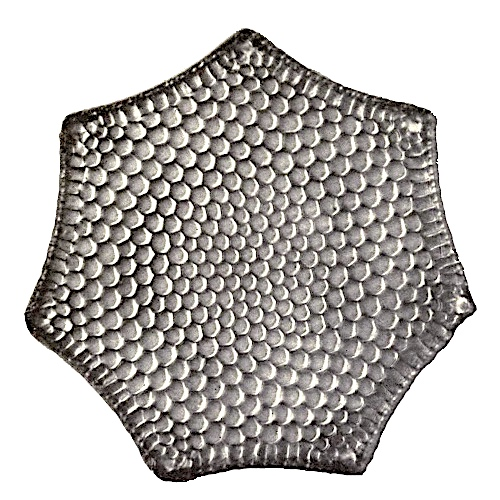

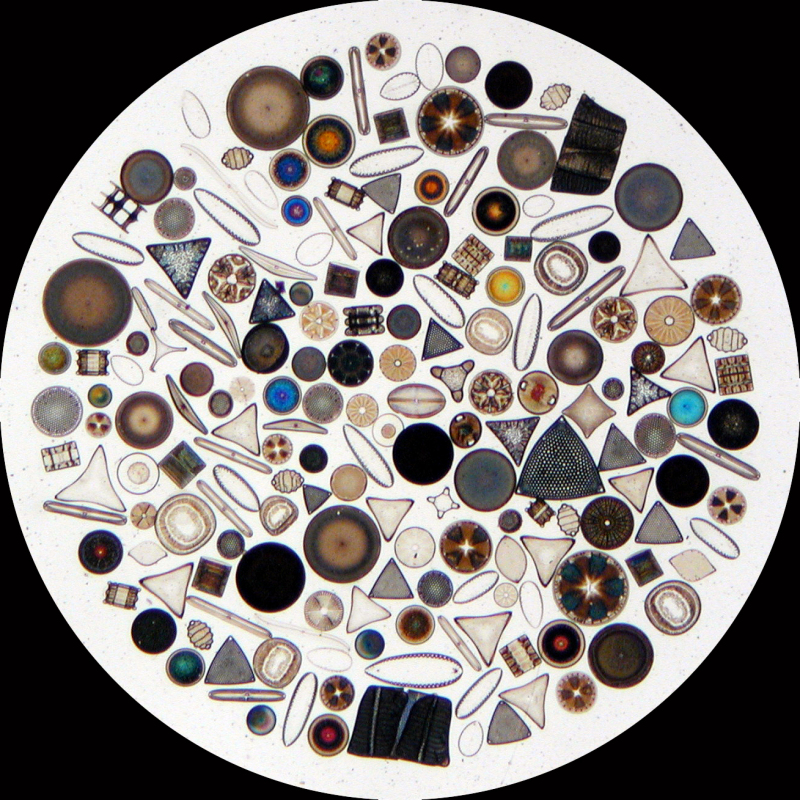
They come in many shapes and sizes

Coccolithophores are minute unicellular photosynthetic protists with two flagella for locomotion. Most of them are protected by a shell covered with ornate circular plates or scales called coccoliths. The coccoliths are made from calcium carbonate. The term coccolithophore derives from the Greek for a seed carrying stone, referring to their small size and the coccolith stones they carry. Under the right conditions they bloom, like other phytoplankton, and can turn the ocean milky white.

Coccolithophores

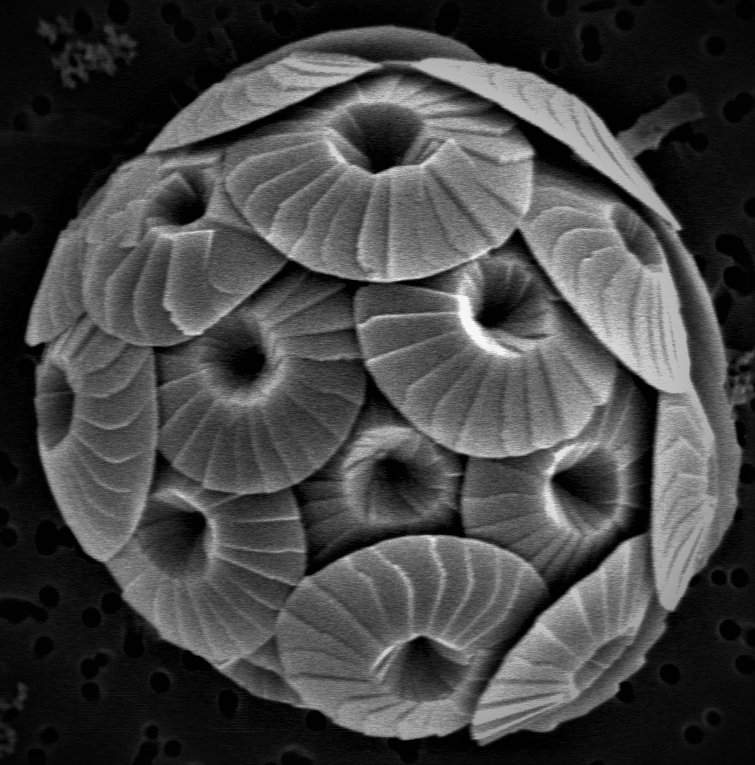
...have plates called coccoliths

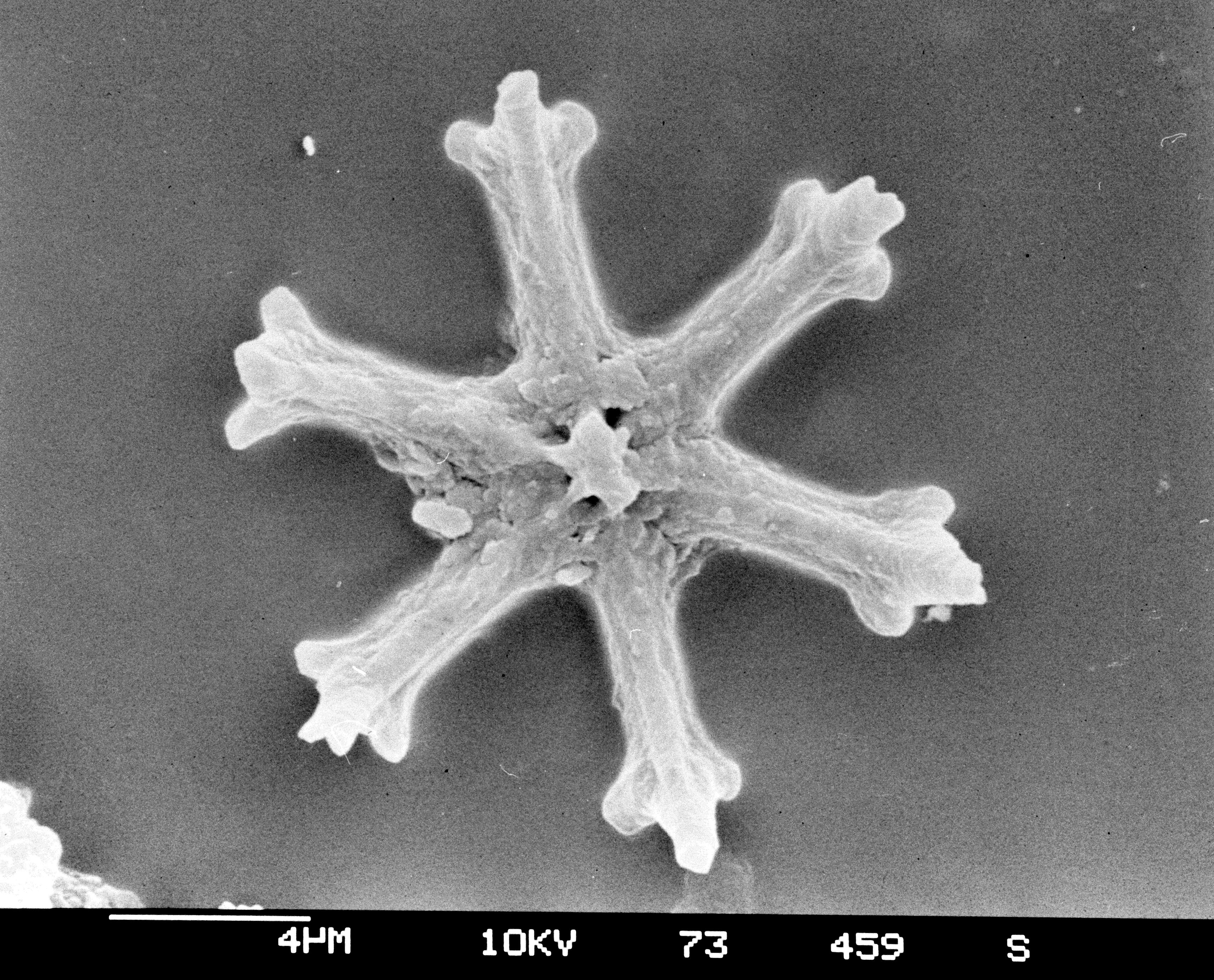
...extinct fossil

Coccolithophores build calcite skeletons important to the marine carbon cycle
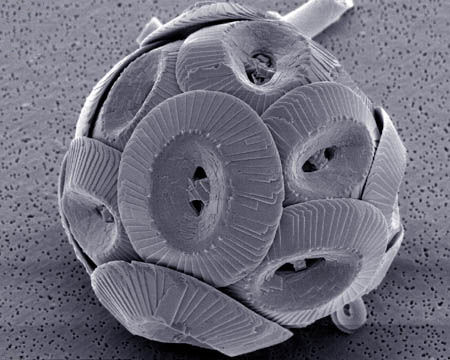

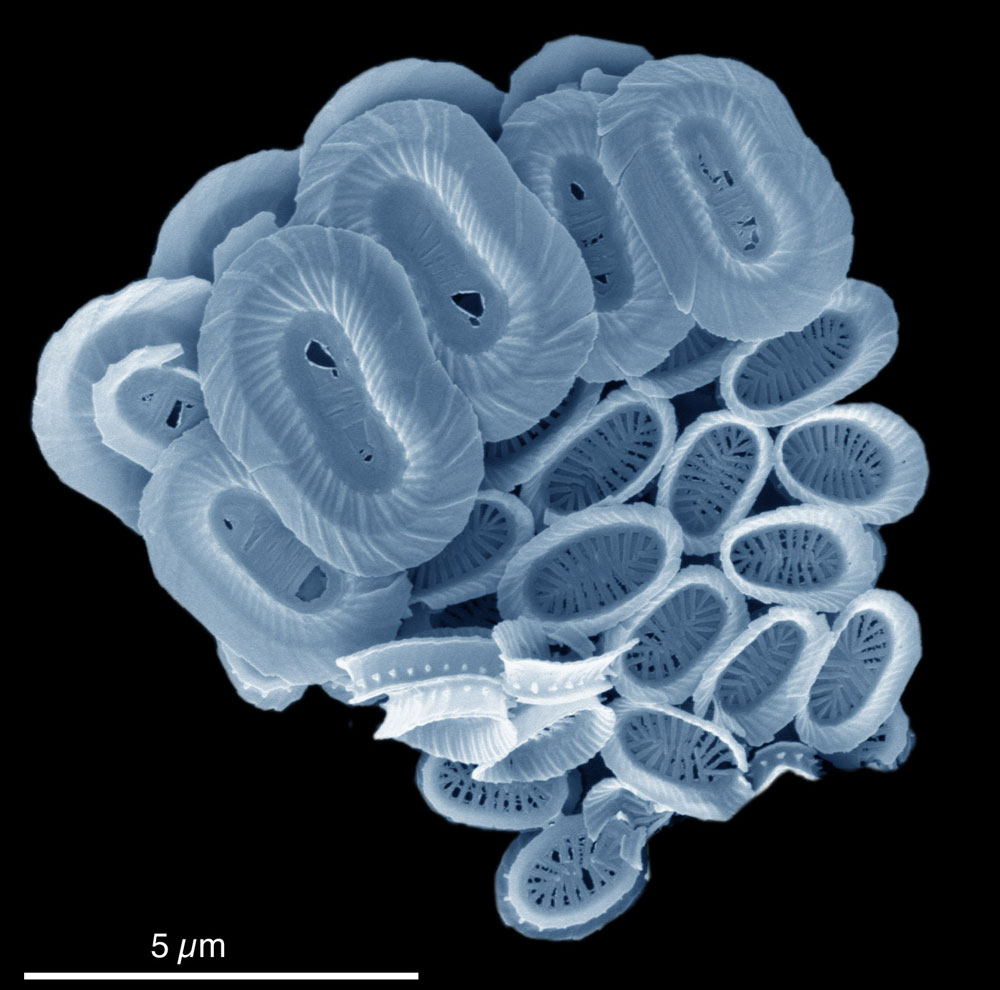
Coccolithophores named after the BBC documentary series
The Blue Planet

Radiolarians are unicellular predatory protists encased in elaborate globular shells usually made of silica and pierced with holes. Their name comes from the Latin for "radius". They catch prey by extending parts of their body through the holes. As with the silica frustules of diatoms, radiolarian shells can sink to the ocean floor when radiolarians die and become preserved as part of the ocean sediment. These remains, as microfossils, provide valuable information about past oceanic conditions.

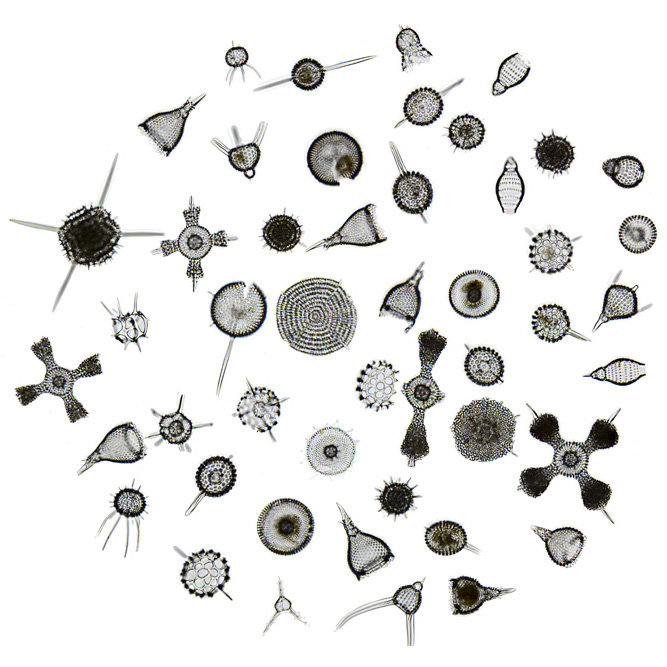
Like diatoms, radiolarians come in many shapes

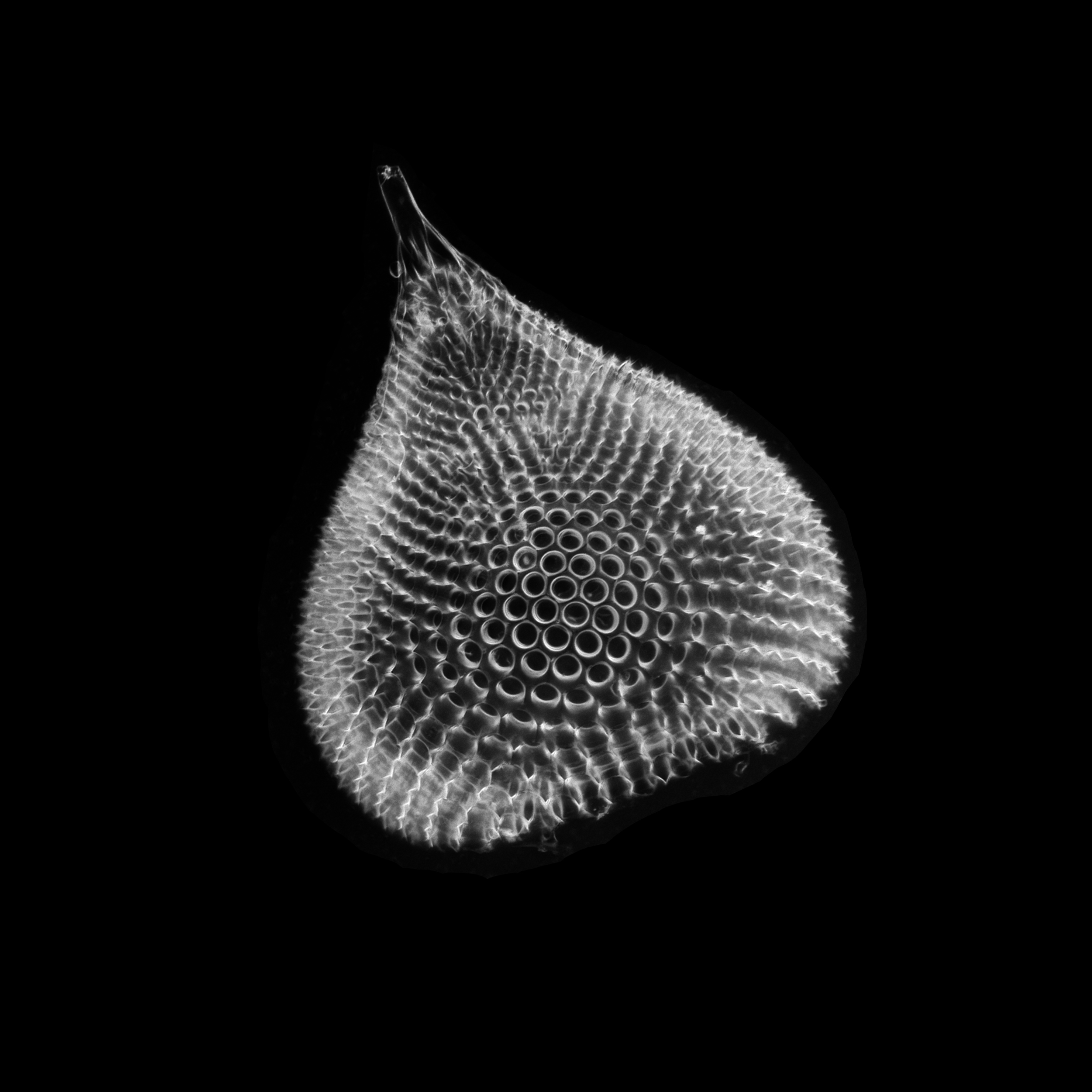
Also like diatoms, radiolarian shells are usually made of silicate

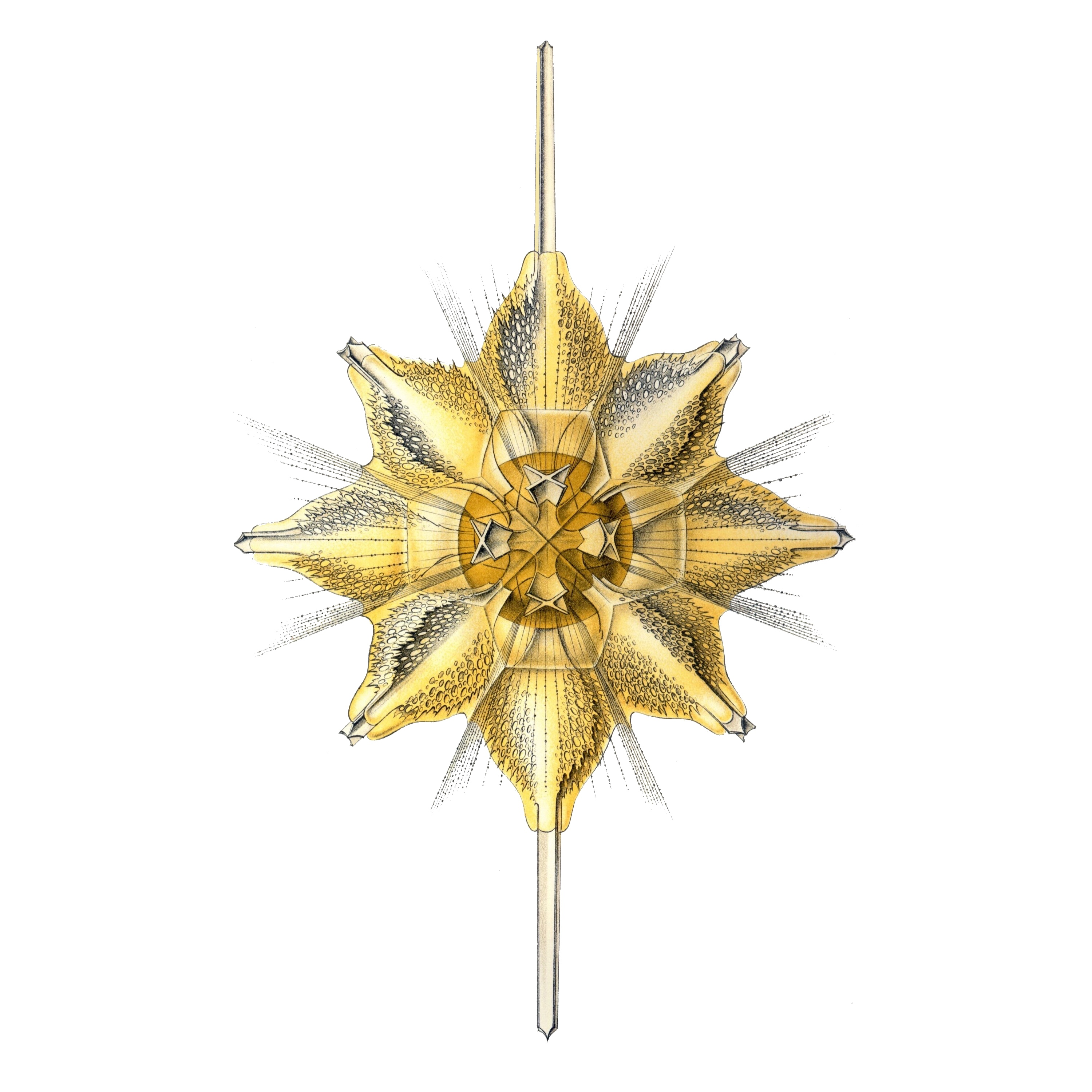
However acantharian radiolarians have shells made from strontium sulfate crystals

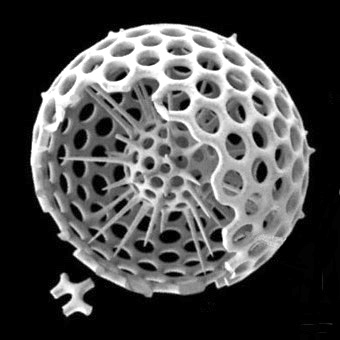
Cutaway schematic diagram of a spherical radiolarian shell
Foraminiferans

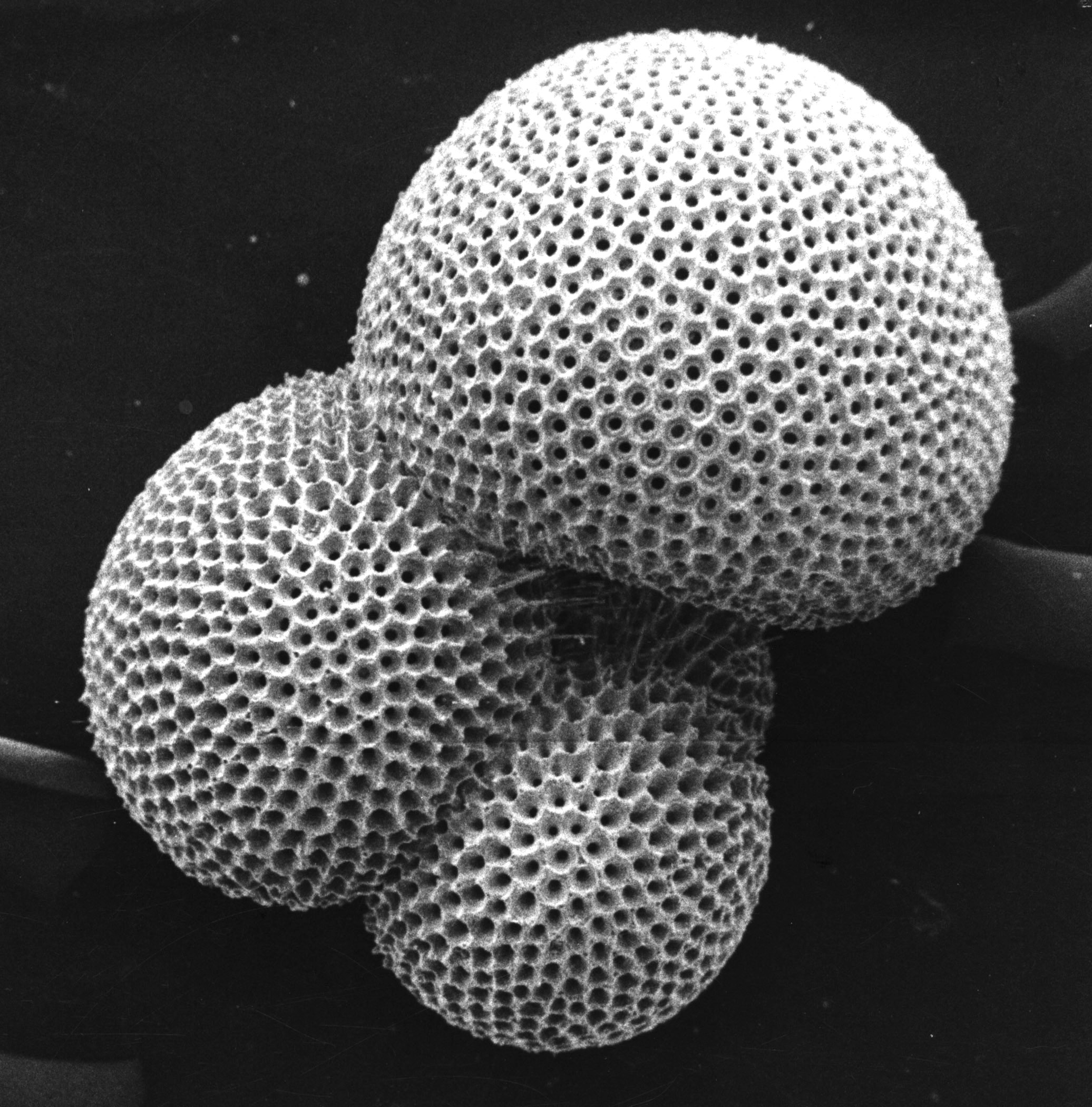
...can have more than one nucleus

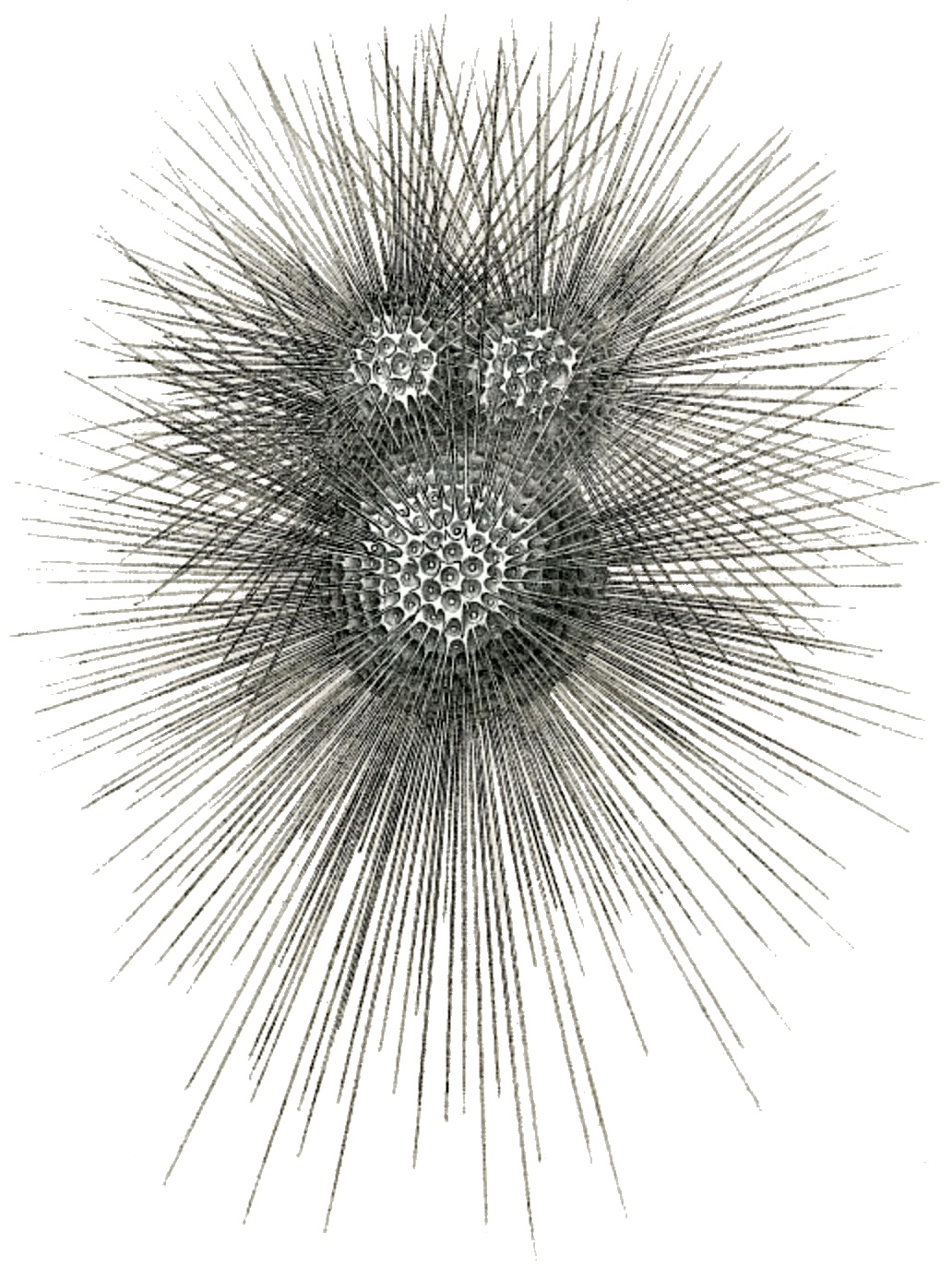
...and defensive spines

Foraminiferans are unicellular zooplankton protists, with calcium tests

Like radiolarians, foraminiferans (forams for short) are single-celled predatory protists, also protected with shells that have holes in them. Their name comes from the Latin for "hole bearers". Their shells, often called tests, are chambered (forams add more chambers as they grow). The shells are usually made of calcite, but are sometimes made of agglutinated sediment particles or chiton, and (rarely) of silica. Most forams are benthic, but about 40 species are planktic. They are widely researched with well established fossil records which allow scientists to infer a lot about past environments and climates.

Both foraminifera and diatoms have planktonic and benthic forms, that is, they can drift in the water column or live on sediment at the bottom of the ocean. Either way, their shells end up on the seafloor after they die. These shells are widely used as climate proxies. The chemical composition of the shells are a consequence of the chemical composition of the ocean at the time the shells were formed. Past water temperatures can be also be inferred from the ratios of stable oxygen isotopes in the shells, since lighter isotopes evaporate more readily in warmer water leaving the heavier isotopes in the shells. Information about past climates can be inferred further from the abundance of forams and diatoms, since they tend to be more abundant in warm water.

The sudden extinction event which killed the dinosaurs 66 million years ago also rendered extinct three-quarters of all other animal and plant species. However, deep-sea benthic forams flourished in the aftermath. In 2020 it was reported that researchers have examined the chemical composition of thousands of samples of these benthic forams and used their findings to build the most detailed climate record of Earth ever.

Some endoliths have extremely long lives. In 2013 researchers reported evidence of endoliths in the ocean floor, perhaps millions of years old, with a generation time of 10,000 years. These are slowly metabolizing and not in a dormant state. Some Actinomycetota found in Siberia are estimated to be half a million years old.

== Sediment cores ==
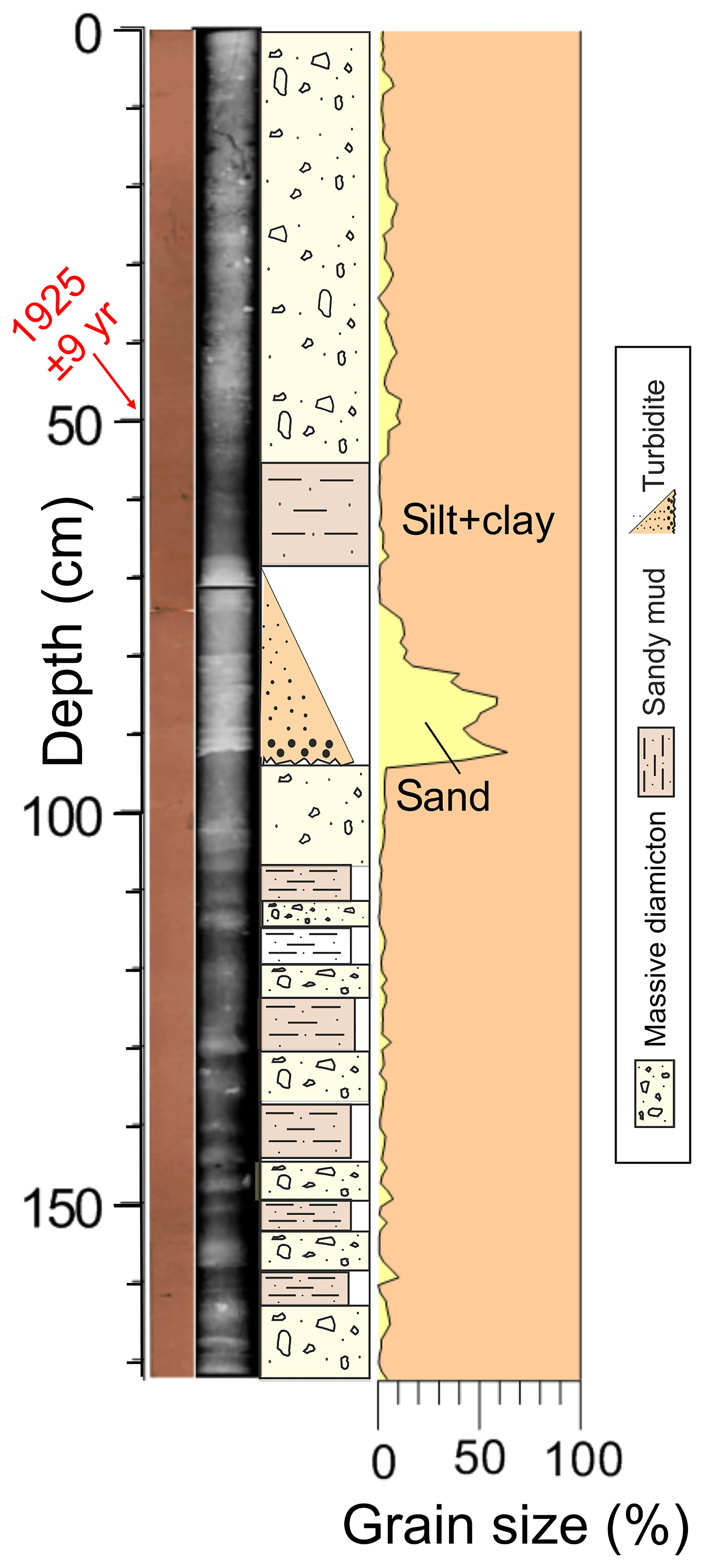
Example of a sediment core - with line scan and X-ray image.

The diagram on the right shows an example of a sediment core. The sample was retrieved from the Upernavik Fjord circa 2018. Grain-size measurements were made, and the top 50 cm was dated with the ^{210}Pb method.

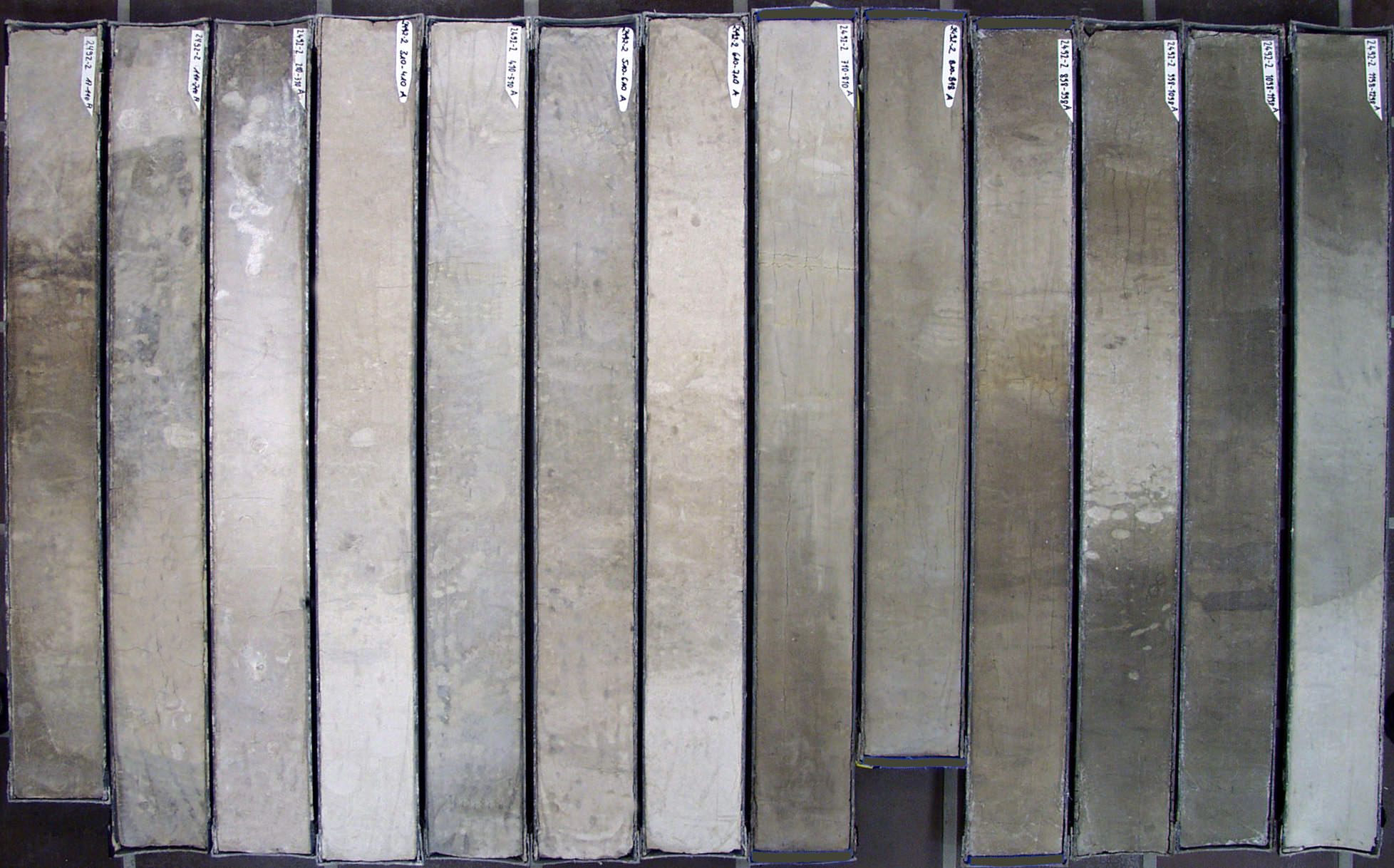
Sediment core, taken with a gravity corer by the research vessel RV Polarstern in the South Atlantic; light/dark-coloured changes are due to climate cycles of the Quaternary; basis age of the core is about one million years (length of each segment is one metre).

== Carbon processing ==
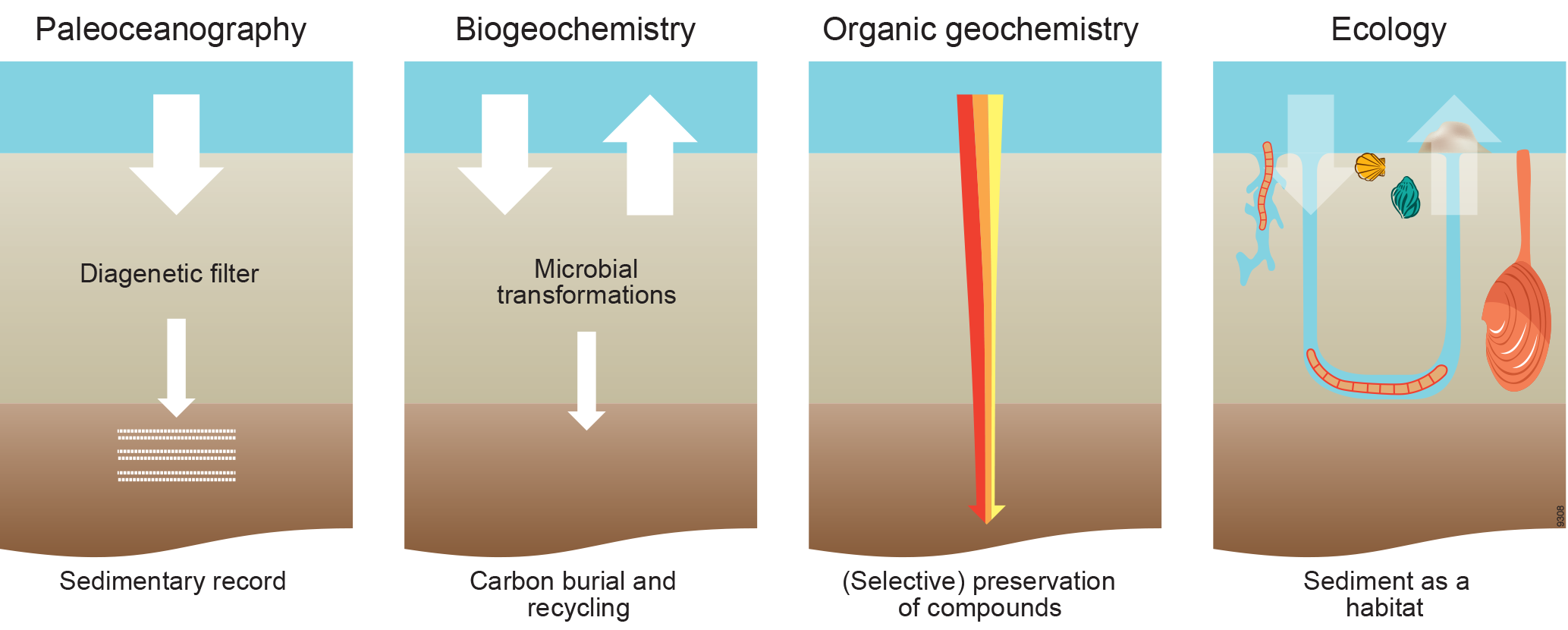
Different approaches to carbon processing in marine sediments Paleoceanographers focus on the sedimentary record Biogeochemists quantify carbon burial and recycling Organic geochemists study alteration of organic matter Ecologists focus on carbon as food for organisms living in the sediment The red–orange–yellow fractions of organic matter have a different lability

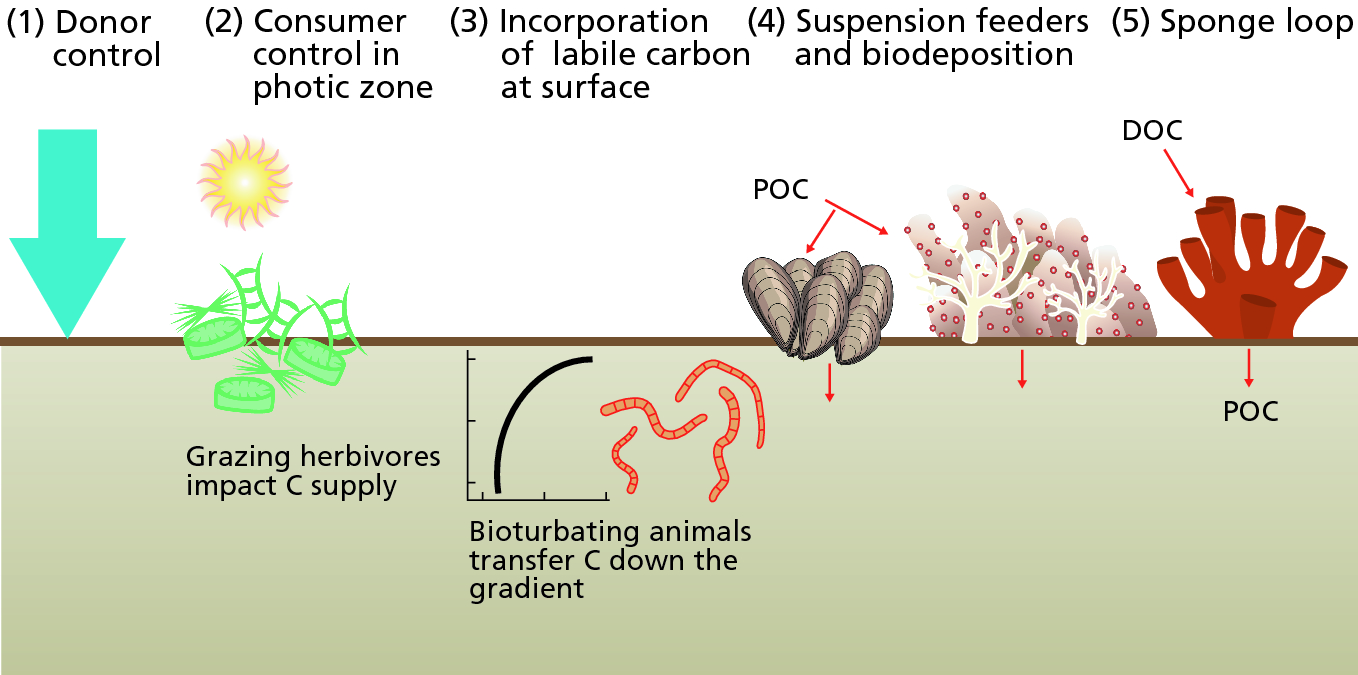
Organic matter supply to sediments ocean (1) Organic matter settling from the water column is deposited at seafloor (donor control; fixed flux upper boundary condition). (2) Sediments in the photic zone are inhabited by benthic microalgae that produce new organic matter in situ and grazing animals can impact the growth of these primary producers. (3) Bioturbating animals transfer labile carbon from the sediment surface layer to deeper layers in the sediments. (Vertical axis is depth; horizontal axis is concentration) (4) Suspension-feeding organisms enhance the transfer of suspended particulate matter from the water column to the sediments (biodeposition). (5) Sponge consume dissolved organic carbon and produce cellular debris that can be consumed by benthic organisms (i.e., the sponge loop).

Thinking about ocean carbon and carbon sequestration has shifted in recent years from a structurally-based chemical reactivity viewpoint toward a view that includes the role of the ecosystem in organic carbon degradation rates. This shift in view towards organic carbon and ecosystem involvement includes aspects of the "molecular revolution" in biology, discoveries on the limits of life, advances in quantitative modelling, paleo studies of ocean carbon cycling, novel analytical techniques, and interdisciplinary efforts. In 2020, LaRowe et al. outlined a broad view of this issue that is spread across multiple scientific disciplines related to marine sediments and global carbon cycling.

== Evolutionary history ==
The supercontinents

Animation of Pangaea rifting

Animation of Pangaea rifting

The surface of the Earth has continually reshaped itself over billions of years. Continents formed and broke apart, migrating across the surface and occasionally combining to form a supercontinent. The earliest-known supercontinent Rodinia assembled about one billion years ago, and then began to break apart about 700 million years ago. The continents later recombined to form Pannotia, 600 to 540 million years ago, then finally Pangaea, which broke apart 200 million years ago.

To begin with, the Earth was molten due to extreme volcanism and frequent collisions with other bodies. Eventually, the outer layer of the planet cooled to form a solid crust and water began accumulating in the atmosphere. The Moon formed soon afterwards, possibly as a result of the impact of a planetoid with the Earth. Outgassing and volcanic activity produced the primordial atmosphere. Condensing water vapor, augmented by ice delivered from comets, produced the oceans.

By the start of the Archean, about four billion years ago, rocks were often heavily metamorphized deep-water sediments, such as graywackes, mudstones, volcanic sediments and banded iron formations. Greenstone belts are typical Archean formations, consisting of alternating high- and low-grade metamorphic rocks. High-grade rocks were derived from volcanic island arcs, while low-grade metamorphic rocks represented deep-sea sediments eroded from the neighboring island rocks and deposited in a forearc basin. The earliest-known supercontinent Rodinia assembled about one billion years ago, and began to break apart after about 250 million years during the latter part of the Proterozoic.

The Paleozoic, 542 to 251 million years ago (Ma), started shortly after the breakup of Pannotia and at the end of a global ice age. Throughout the early Paleozoic, the Earth's landmass was broken up into a substantial number of relatively small continents. Toward the end of the era the continents gathered together into a supercontinent called Pangaea, which included most of the Earth's land area. During the Silurian, which started 444 Ma, Gondwana continued a slow southward drift to high southern latitudes. The melting of ice caps and glaciers contributed to a rise in sea levels, recognizable from the fact that Silurian sediments overlie eroded Ordovician sediments, forming an unconformity. Other cratons and continent fragments drifted together near the equator, starting the formation of a second supercontinent known as Euramerica.

During the Triassic deep-ocean sediments were laid down and subsequently disappeared through the subduction of oceanic plates, so very little is known of the Triassic open ocean. The supercontinent Pangaea rifted during the Triassic – especially late in the period – but had not yet separated. The first non-marine sediments in the rift that marks the initial break-up of Pangea are of Late Triassic age. Because of the limited shoreline of one super-continental mass, Triassic marine deposits are globally relatively rare; despite their prominence in Western Europe where the Triassic was first studied. In North America, for example, marine deposits are limited to a few exposures in the west. Thus Triassic stratigraphy is mostly based on organisms living in lagoons and hypersaline environments, such as Estheria crustaceans and terrestrial vertebrates.

Geologic time represented by a geological clock, showing the relative lengths of the eons of Earth's history and noting major events

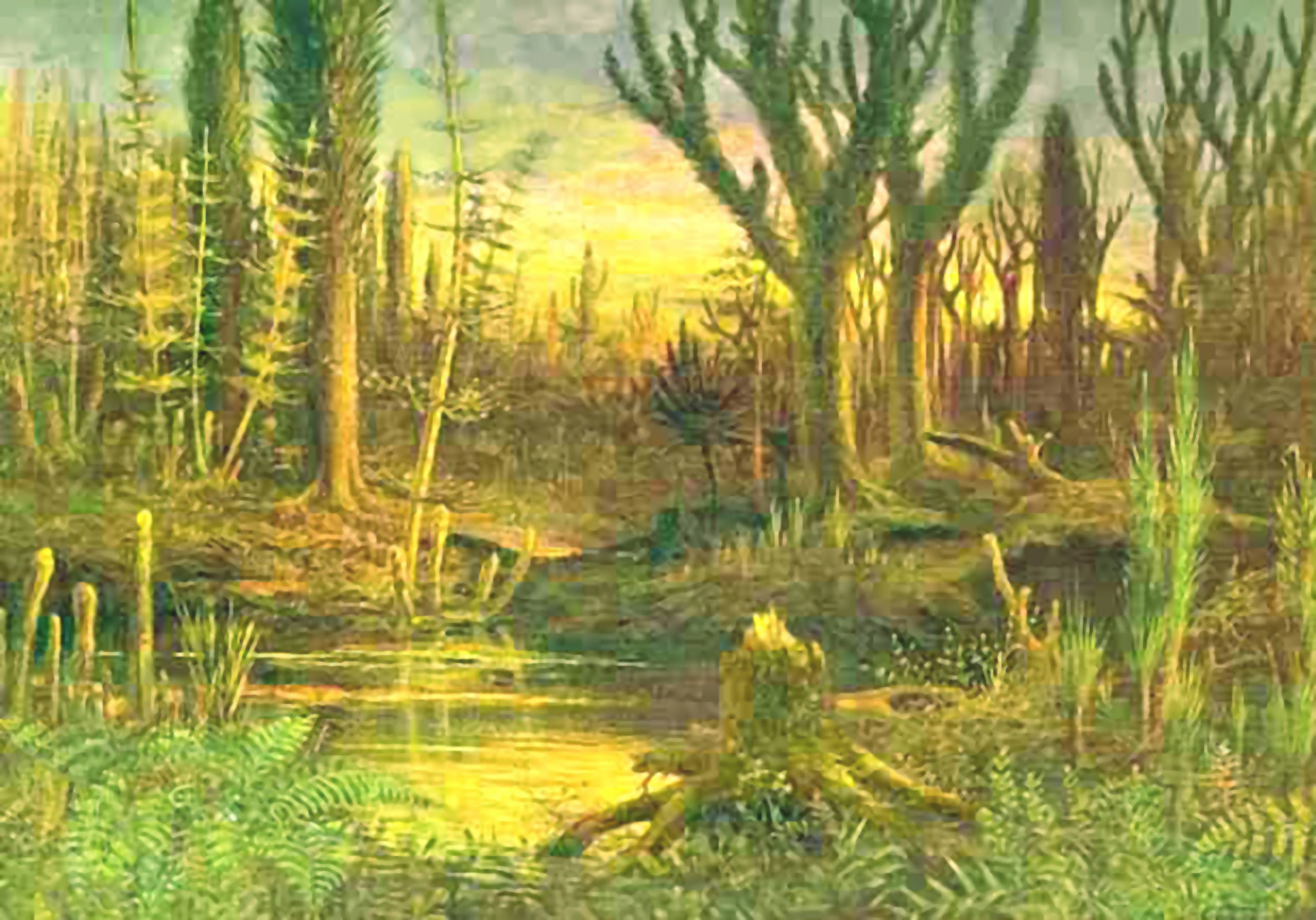
The Devonian marks the beginning of extensive land colonization by plants, which – through their effects on erosion and sedimentation – brought about significant climatic change.

Patterns or traces of bioturbation are preserved in lithified rock. The study of such patterns is called ichnology, or the study of "trace fossils", which, in the case of bioturbators, are fossils left behind by digging or burrowing animals. This can be compared to the footprint left behind by these animals. In some cases bioturbation is so pervasive that it completely obliterates sedimentary structures, such as laminated layers or cross-bedding. Thus, it affects the disciplines of sedimentology and stratigraphy within geology. The study of bioturbator ichnofabrics uses the depth of the fossils, the cross-cutting of fossils, and the sharpness (or how well defined) of the fossil to assess the activity that occurred in old sediments. Typically the deeper the fossil, the better preserved and well defined the specimen.

Important trace fossils from bioturbation have been found in marine sediments from tidal, coastal and deep sea sediments. In addition sand dune, or Eolian, sediments are important for preserving a wide variety of fossils. Evidence of bioturbation has been found in deep-sea sediment cores including into long records, although the act extracting the core can disturb the signs of bioturbation, especially at shallower depths. Arthropods, in particular are important to the geologic record of bioturbation of Eolian sediments. Dune records show traces of burrowing animals as far back as the lower Mesozoic, 250 Ma, although bioturbation in other sediments has been seen as far back as 550 Ma.

== Research history ==
The first major study of deep-ocean sediments occurred between 1872 and 1876 with the HMS Challenger expedition, which travelled nearly 70,000 nautical miles sampling seawater and marine sediments. The scientific goals of the expedition were to take physical measurements of the seawater at various depths, as well as taking samples so the chemical composition could be determined, along with any particulate matter or marine organisms that were present. This included taking samples and analysing sediments from the deep ocean floor. Before the Challenger voyage, oceanography had been mainly speculative. As the first true oceanographic cruise, the Challenger expedition laid the groundwork for an entire academic and research discipline.

Earlier theories of continental drift proposed that continents in motion "plowed" through the fixed and immovable seafloor. Later in the 1960s the idea that the seafloor itself moves and also carries the continents with it as it spreads from a central rift axis was proposed by Harold Hess and Robert Dietz. The phenomenon is known today as plate tectonics. In locations where two plates move apart, at mid-ocean ridges, new seafloor is continually formed during seafloor spreading. In 1968, the oceanographic research vessel Glomar Challenger was launched and embarked on a 15-year-long program, the Deep Sea Drilling Program. This program provided crucial data that supported the seafloor spreading hypothesis by collecting rock samples that confirmed that the farther from the mid-ocean ridge, the older the rock was.

== See also ==
- Bioturbation
- Depositional environment
- Cosmic dust
  - Interplanetary dust
- Deep biosphere
- Great Calcite Belt
- Marine clay
- Microbially induced sedimentary structure
- Oolitic aragonite sand
- Organic-rich sedimentary rocks
- Paleolimnology § Paleoclimate proxies
- Redox gradient
- Seafloor depth versus age
- Sediment-water interface
- Sedimentary rock
- Sediment transport
  - Coastal sediment transport
  - Coastal sediment supply

== Sources ==
- Stanley, Steven M. (1999). Earth system history. New York: W. H. Freeman. ISBN 978-0-7167-3377-5.
