= Silica cycle =

Biogeochemical cycle

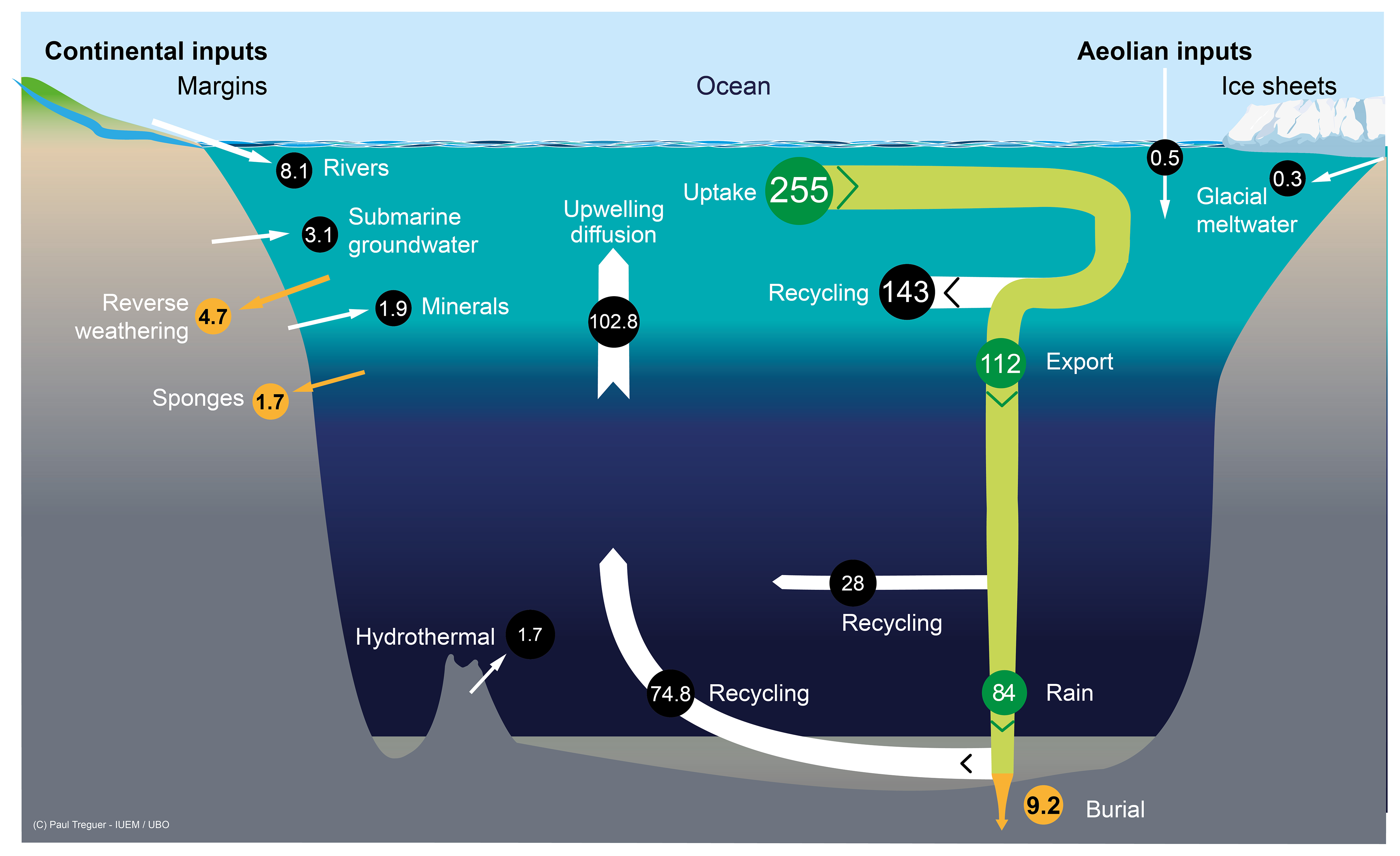
Silicon cycle and balance in the modern world ocean Input, output, and biological silicon fluxes, with possible balance. Total silicon inputs = total silicon outputs = 15.6 Tmol Si yr^{−1} in reasonable agreement with the individual range of each flux. White arrows represent fluxes of net sources of dissolved silicic acid and/or of dissolvable amorphous silica and of dissolved silicic acid recycled fluxes. Orange arrows represent sink fluxes of silicon, either as biogenic silica or as authigenic silica. Green arrows correspond to biological (pelagic) fluxes. Values of flux as published by Tréguer & De La Rocha. Fluxes in teramoles of silicon per year (Tmol Si yr^{−1}).

The silica cycle is the biogeochemical cycle in which biogenic silica is transported between the Earth's systems. Silicon is one of the most abundant elements on Earth, and is considered necessary for life. The silica cycle has significant overlap with the carbon cycle (see carbonate–silicate cycle) and plays an important role in the sequestration of carbon through continental weathering, biogenic export and burial as oozes on geologic timescales.

== Overview ==
Silicon is the eighth most abundant element in the universe and the second most abundant element in the Earth's crust (the most abundant is oxygen). The weathering of the Earth's crust by rainwater rich in carbon dioxide is a key process in the control of atmospheric carbon dioxide. It results in the generation of silicic acid in aqueous environments. Silicic acid, Si(OH)_{4}, is a hydrated form of silica found only as an unstable solution in water, yet it plays a central role in the silica cycle.

Silicifiers are organisms that use silicic acid to precipitate biogenic silica, SiO_{2}. Biogenic silica, also referred to as opal, is precipitated by silicifiers as internal structures and/or external structures. Silicifiers are among the most important aquatic organisms. They include micro-organisms such as diatoms, rhizarians, silicoflagellates and several species of choanoflagellates, as well as macro-organisms such as siliceous sponges. Phototrophic silicifiers, such as diatoms, globally consume vast amounts of silicon along with nitrogen (N), phosphorus (P), and inorganic carbon (C), connecting the biogeochemistry of these elements and contributing to the sequestration of atmospheric carbon dioxide in the ocean. Heterotrophic organisms like rhizarians, choanoflagellates, and sponges produce biogenic silica independently of the photoautotrophic processing of C and N.

The diatoms dominate the fixation and export of particulate matter in the contemporary marine silica cycle. This includes the export of organic carbon from the euphotic zone to the deep ocean via the biological carbon pump. As a result, diatoms, and other silica-secreting organisms play crucial roles in the global carbon cycle by sequestering carbon in the ocean. The connection between biogenic silica and organic carbon, together with the significantly higher preservation potential of biogenic siliceous compounds compared to organic carbon makes opal accumulation records of interest in paleoceanography and paleoclimatology.

Understanding the silica cycle is important for understanding the functioning of marine food webs, biogeochemical cycles, and the biological pump. Silicic acid is delivered to the ocean through six pathways as illustrated in the diagram above, which all ultimately derive from the weathering of the Earth's crust.

== Terrestrial silica cycling ==
Silica is an important nutrient utilized by plants, trees, and grasses in the terrestrial biosphere. Silicate is transported by rivers and can be deposited in soils in the form of various siliceous polymorphs. Plants can readily uptake silicate in the form of H_{4}SiO_{4} for the formation of phytoliths. Phytoliths are tiny rigid structures found within plant cells that aid in the structural integrity of the plant. Phytoliths also serve to protect the plants from consumption by herbivores who are unable to consume and digest silica-rich plants efficiently. Silica release from phytolith degradation or dissolution is estimated to occur at a rate double that of global silicate mineral weathering. Considering biogeochemical cycling within ecosystems, the import and export of silica to and from terrestrial ecosystems is small.

=== Weathering ===
Silicate minerals are abundant in rock formations all over the planet, comprising approximately 90% of the Earth's crust. The primary source of silicate to the terrestrial biosphere is weathering. The process and rate of weathering is variable, depending on rainfall, runoff, vegetation, lithology, and topography.

Given sufficient time, rainwater can dissolve even a highly resistant silicate-based mineral such as quartz. Water breaks the bonds between atoms in the crystal:

The overall reaction for the dissolution of quartz results in silicic acid

SiO_{2} + 2H_{2}O → H_{4}SiO_{4}

Another example of a silicate-based mineral is enstatite (MgSiO_{3}). Rainwater weathers this to silicic acid as follows:

$\ce{MgSiO3(s) + 2CO2(g) + H2O(l) = Mg2+(aq) + 2HCO3- (aq) + SiO2(aq)}$

=== Reverse weathering ===
In recent years, the effect of reverse weathering on biogenic silica has been of interest in quantifying the silica cycle. During weathering, dissolved silica is delivered to oceans through glacial runoff and riverine inputs. This dissolved silica is taken up by a multitude of marine organisms, such as diatoms, and is used to create protective shells. When these organisms die, they sink through the water column. Without active production of biogenic SiO_{2}, the mineral begins diagenesis. Conversion of this dissolved silica into authigenic silicate clays through the process of reverse weathering constitutes a removal of 20-25% of silicon input.

Reverse weathering is often found in river deltas as these systems have high sediment accumulation rates and are observed to undergo rapid diagenesis. The formation of silicate clays removes reactive silica from the pore waters of sediment, increasing the concentration of silica found in the rocks that form in these locations.

Silicate weathering also appears to be a dominant process in deeper methanogenic sediments, whereas reverse weathering is more common in surface sediments, but still occurs at a lower rate.

=== Sinks ===
The major sink of the terrestrial silica cycle is export to the ocean by rivers. Silica that is stored in plant matter or dissolved can be exported to the ocean by rivers. The rate of this transport is approximately 6 Tmol Si yr^{−1}. This is the major sink of the terrestrial silica cycle, as well as the largest source of the marine silica cycle. A minor sink for terrestrial silica is silicate that is deposited in terrestrial sediments and eventually exported to the Earth's crust.

== Marine inputs ==
Inputs to the marine silica cycle
adapted from Treguer et al., 1995

=== Riverine ===
As of 2021, the best estimate of the total riverine input of silicic acid is 6.2 (±1.8) Tmol Si yr^{−1}. This is based on data representing 60% of the world river discharge and a discharge-weighted average silicic acid riverine concentration of 158 μM−Si. However, silicic acid is not the only way silicon can be transferred from terrestrial to riverine systems, since particulate silicon can also be mobilised in crystallised or amorphous forms. According to Saccone and others in 2007, the term "amorphous silica" includes biogenic silica (from phytoliths, freshwater diatoms, sponge spicules), altered biogenic silica, and pedogenic silicates, the three of which can have similar high solubilities and reactivities. Delivery of amorphous silica to the fluvial system has been reviewed by Frings and others in 2016, who suggested a value of 1.9(±1.0) Tmol Si yr^{−1}. Therefore, the total riverine input is 8.1(±2.0) Tmol Si yr^{−1}.

=== Aeolian ===
No progress has been made regarding aeolian dust deposition into the ocean and subsequent release of silicic acid via dust dissolution in seawater since 2013, when Tréguer and De La Rocha summed the flux of particulate dissolvable silica and wet deposition of silicic acid through precipitation. Thus, the best estimate for the aeolian flux of silicic acid, FA, remains 0.5(±0.5) Tmol Si yr^{−1}.

=== Sandy beaches ===
A 2019 study has proposed that, in the surf zone of beaches, wave action disturbed abiotic sand grains and dissolved them over time. To test this, the researchers placed sand samples in closed containers with different kinds of water and rotated the containers to simulate wave action. They discovered that the higher the rock/water ratio within the container, and the faster the container spun, the more silica dissolved into solution. After analyzing and upscaling their results, they estimated that anywhere from 3.2 ± 1.0 – 5.0 ± 2.0 Tmol Si yr^{−1} of lithogenic DSi could enter the ocean from sandy beaches, a massive increase from a previous estimate of 0.3 Tmol Si yr^{−1}. If confirmed, this represents a significant input of dissolved LSi that was previously ignored.

== Marine silica cycling ==
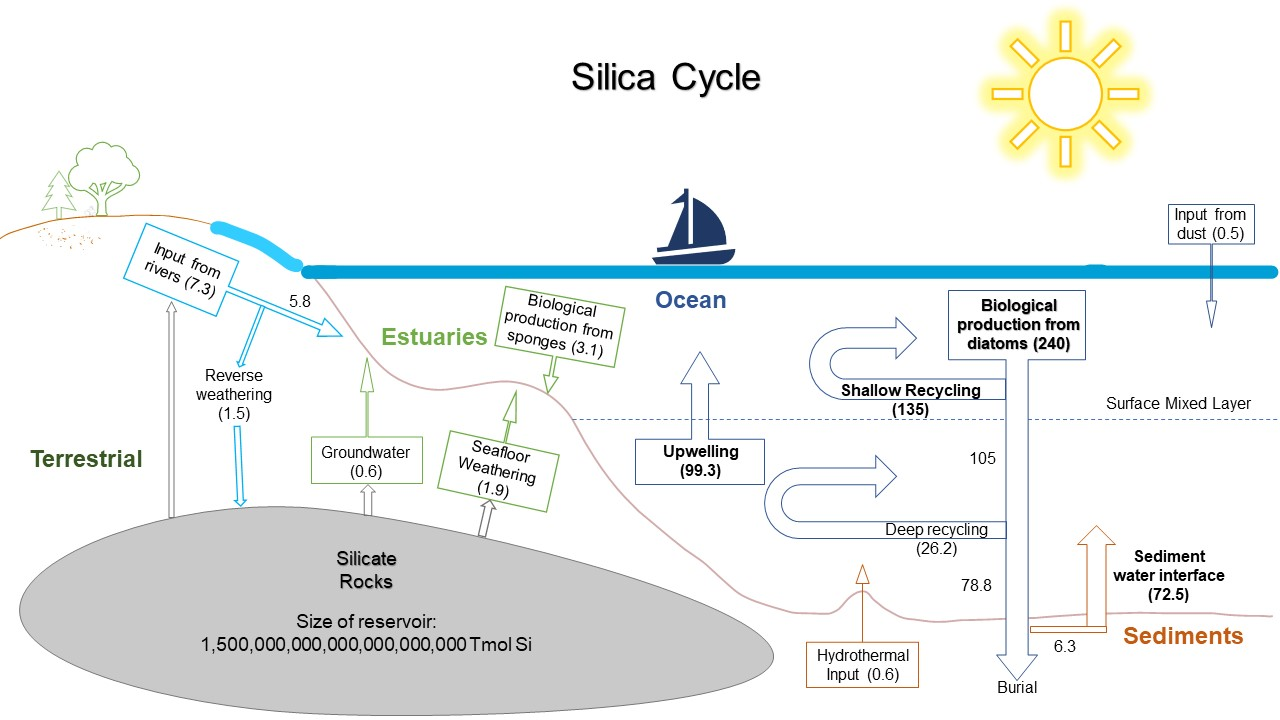
Marine and terrestrial contributions to the silica cycle are shown, with the relative movement (flux) provided in units of Tmol Si/yr. Marine biological production primarily comes from diatoms. Estuary biological production is due to sponges. Values of flux as published by Tréguer & De La Rocha. Reservoir size of silicate rocks, as discussed in the sources section, is 1.5 × 10^{21} Tmol.

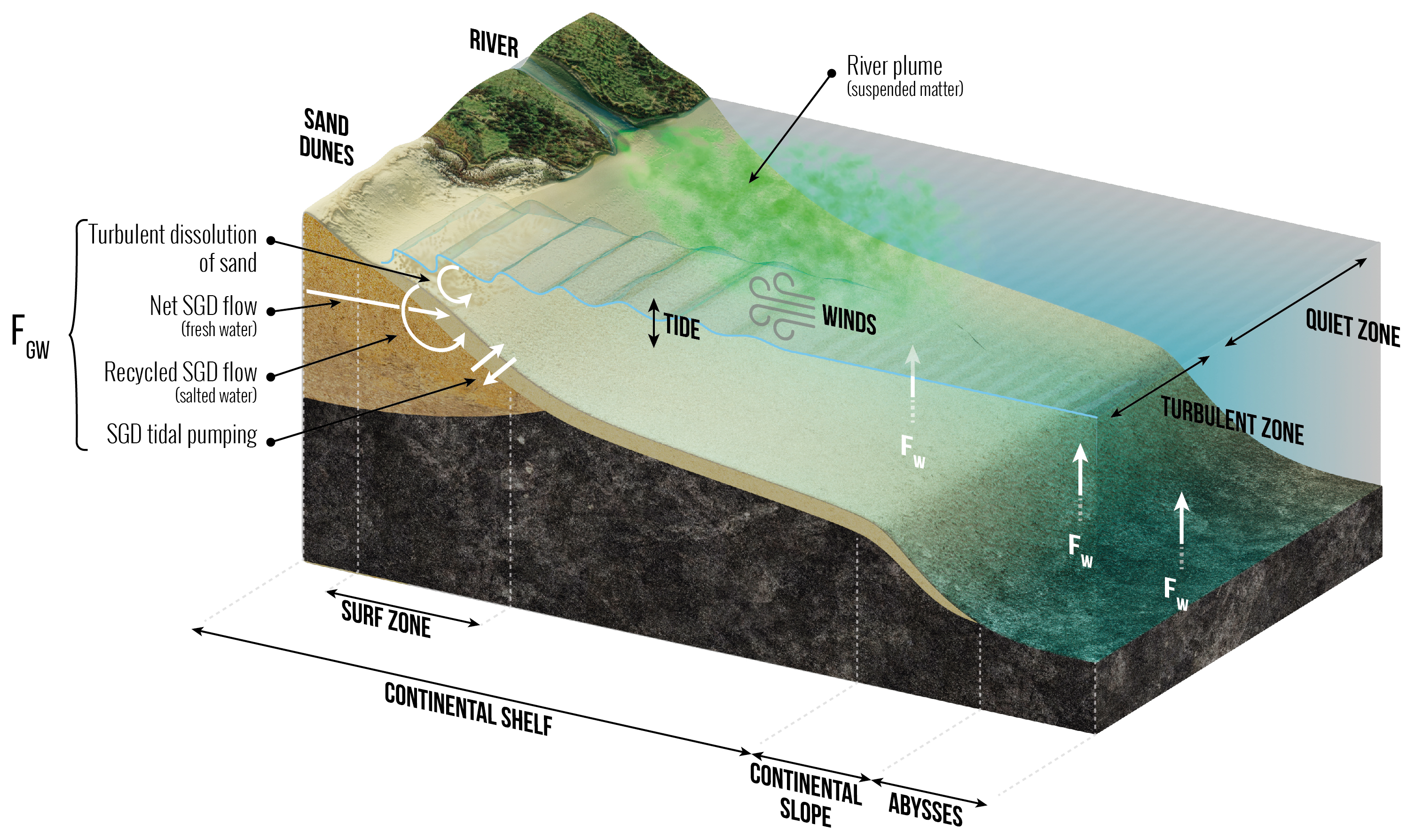
Low-temperature processes controlling silicon dissolution in seawater

Siliceous organisms in the ocean, such as diatoms and radiolaria, are the primary sink of dissolved silicic acid into opal silica. Only 3% of the Si molecules dissolved in the ocean are exported and permanently deposited in marine sediments on the seafloor each year, demonstrating that silicon recycling is a dominant process in the oceans. This rapid recycling is dependent on the dissolution of silica in organic matter in the water column, followed by biological uptake in the photic zone. The estimated residence time of the silica biological reservoir is about 400 years. Opal silica is predominately undersaturated in the world's oceans. This undersaturation promotes rapid dissolution as a result of constant recycling and long residence times. The estimated turnover time of Si is 1.5 × 10^{4} years. The total net inputs and outputs of silica in the ocean are 9.4 ± 4.7 Tmol Si yr^{−1} and 9.9 ± 7.3 Tmol Si yr^{−1}, respectively.

Biogenic silica production in the photic zone is estimated to be 240 ± 40 Tmol Si year ^{−1}. Dissolution in the surface removes roughly 135 Tmol Si year^{−1}, while the remaining Si is exported to the deep ocean within sinking particles. In the deep ocean, another 26.2 Tmol Si Year^{−1} is dissolved before being deposited to the sediments as opal rain. Over 90% of the silica here is dissolved, recycled and eventually upwelled for use again in the euphotic zone.

=== Sources ===
The major sources of marine silica include rivers, groundwater flux, seafloor weathering inputs, hydrothermal vents, and atmospheric deposition (aeolian flux). Rivers are by far the largest source of silica to the marine environment, accounting for up to 90% of all the silica delivered to the ocean. Another source of silica for the marine biological silica cycle is silica that has been recycled by upwelling from the deep ocean and seafloor.

The diagram on low-temperature processes shows how these can control the dissolution of (either amorphous or crystallized) siliceous minerals in seawater in and to the coastal zone and in the deep ocean, feeding submarine groundwater (F_{GW}) and dissolved silicon in seawater and sediments (F_{W}). These processes correspond to both low and medium energy flux dissipated per volume of a given siliceous particle in the coastal zone, in the continental margins, and in the abysses and to high-energy flux dissipated in the surf zone.

=== Sinks ===
Rapid dissolution in the surface removes roughly 135 Tmol opal Si year^{−1}, converting it back to soluble silicic acid that can be used again for biomineralization. The remaining opal silica is exported to the deep ocean in sinking particles. In the deep ocean, another 26.2 Tmol Si Year^{−1} is dissolved before being deposited to the sediments as opal silica. At the sediment water interface, over 90% of the silica is recycled and upwelled for use again in the photic zone. Biogenic silica production in the photic zone is estimated to be 240 ± 40 Tmol si year ^{−1}. The residence time on a biological timescale is estimated to be about 400 years, with each molecule of silica recycled 25 times before sediment burial.

Deep seafloor deposition is the largest long-term sink of the marine silica cycle (6.3 ± 3.6 Tmol Si year^{−1}), and is roughly balanced by the sources of silica to the ocean. The silica deposited in the deep ocean is primarily in the form of siliceous ooze. When opal silica accumulates faster than it dissolves, it is buried and can provide a diagenetic environment for marine chert formation. The processes leading to chert formation have been observed in the Southern Ocean, where siliceous ooze accumulation is the fastest. Chert formation however can take tens of millions of years. Skeleton fragments from siliceous organisms are subject to recrystallization and cementation. Chert is the main fate of buried siliceous ooze and permanently removes silica from the oceanic silica cycle.

The siliceous ooze is eventually subducted under the crust and metamorphosed in the upper mantle. Under the mantle, silicate minerals are formed in oozes and eventually uplifted to the surface. At the surface, silica can enter the cycle again through weathering. This process can take tens of millions of years. The only other major sink of silica in the ocean is burial along continental margins (3.6 ± 3.7 Tmol Si year ^{−1}), primarily in the form of siliceous sponges. Due to the high degrees of uncertainty in source and sink estimations, it's difficult to conclude if the marine silica cycle is in equilibrium. The residence time of silica in the oceans is estimated to be about 10,000 years. Silica can also be removed from the cycle by becoming chert and being permanently buried.

== Anthropogenic influences ==
The rise in agriculture of the past 400 years has increased the exposure rocks and soils, which has resulted in increased rates of silicate weathering. In turn, the leaching of amorphous silica stocks from soils has also increased, delivering higher concentrations of dissolved silica in rivers. Conversely, increased damming has led to a reduction in silica supply to the ocean due to uptake by freshwater diatoms behind dams. The dominance of non-siliceous phytoplankton due to anthropogenic nitrogen and phosphorus loading and enhanced silica dissolution in warmer waters has the potential to limit silicon ocean sediment export in the future.

In 2019 a group of scientists suggested acidification is reducing diatom silica production in the Southern Ocean.

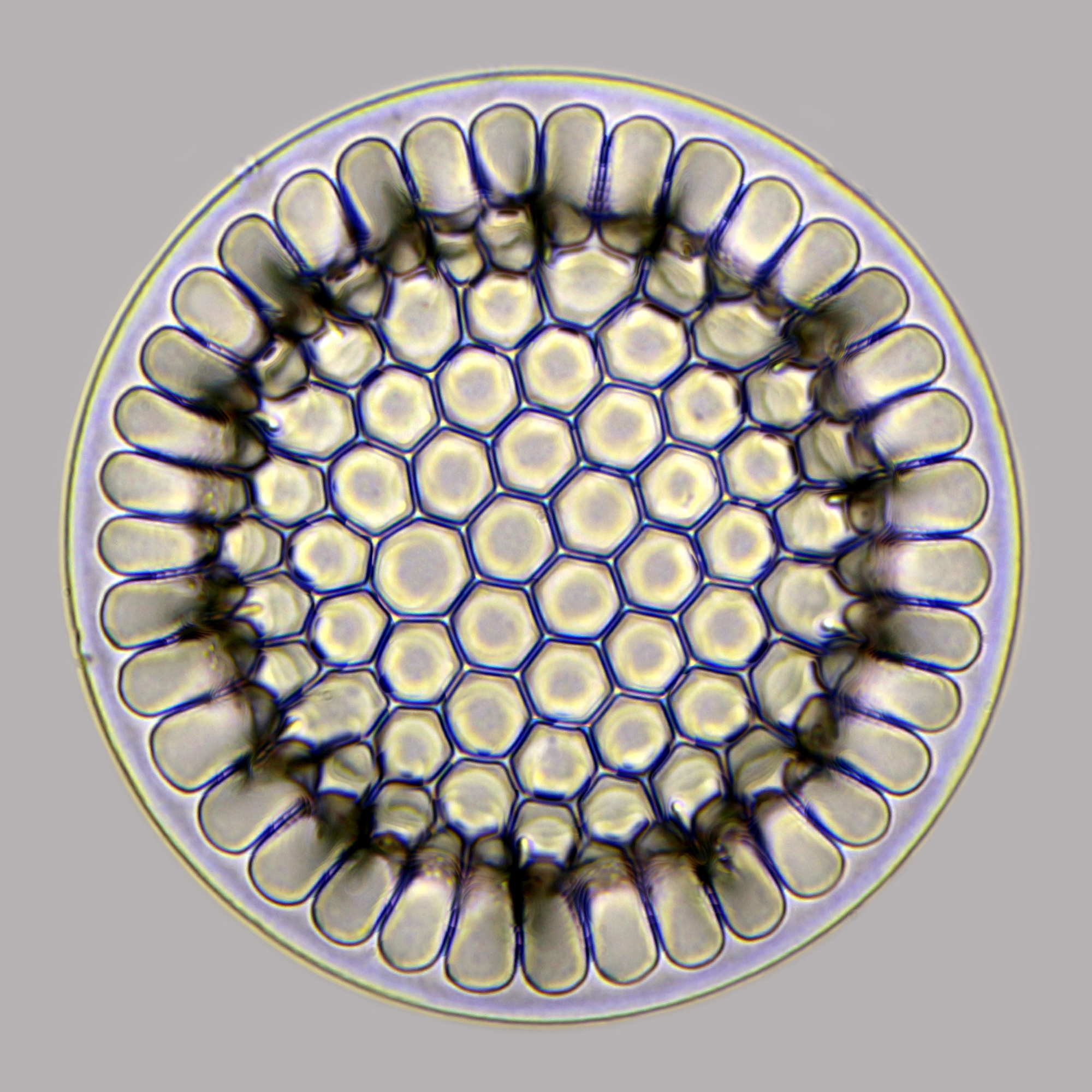
Diatom

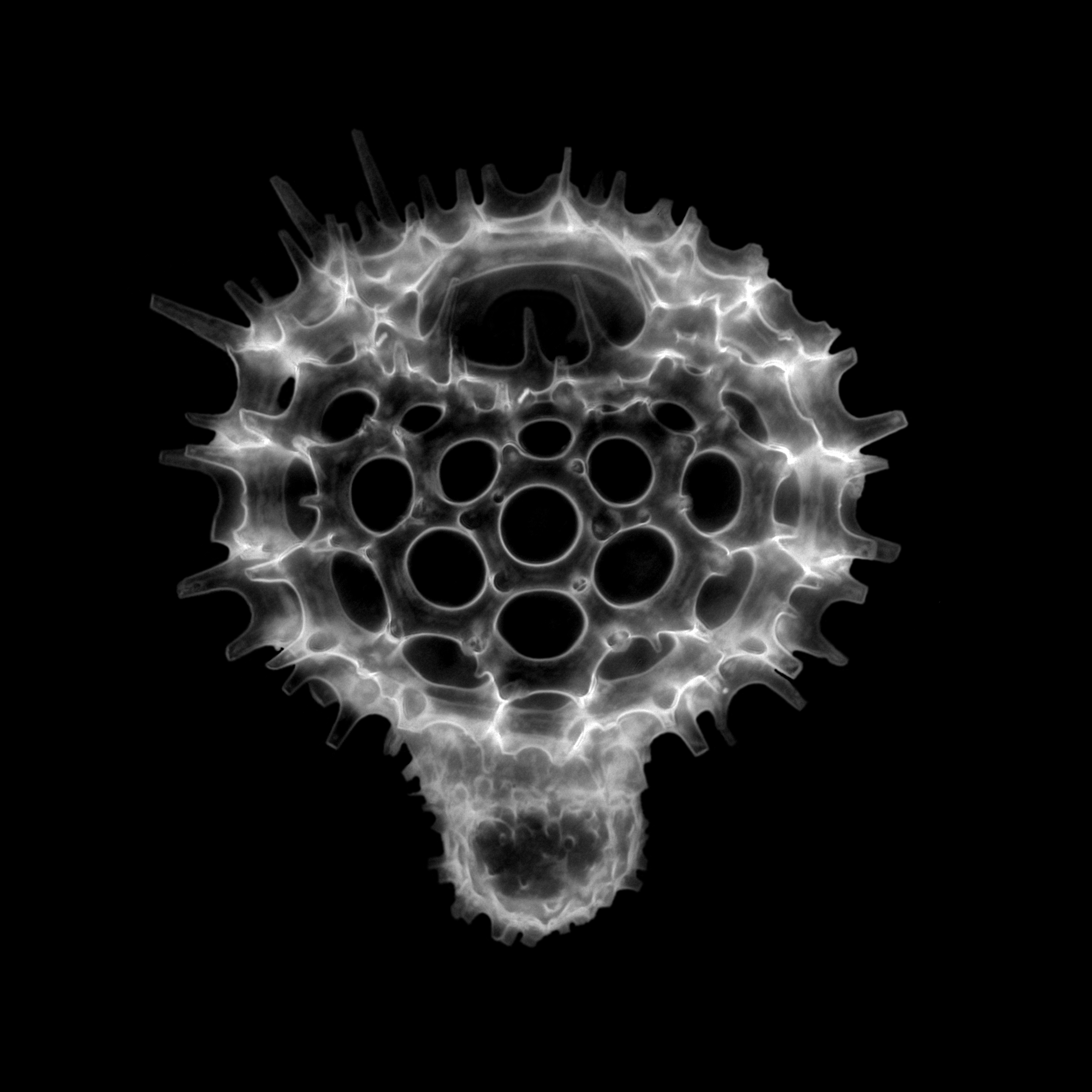
Radiolarian

Changes in ocean silicic acid can make it difficult for the marine microorganisms that construct silica shells
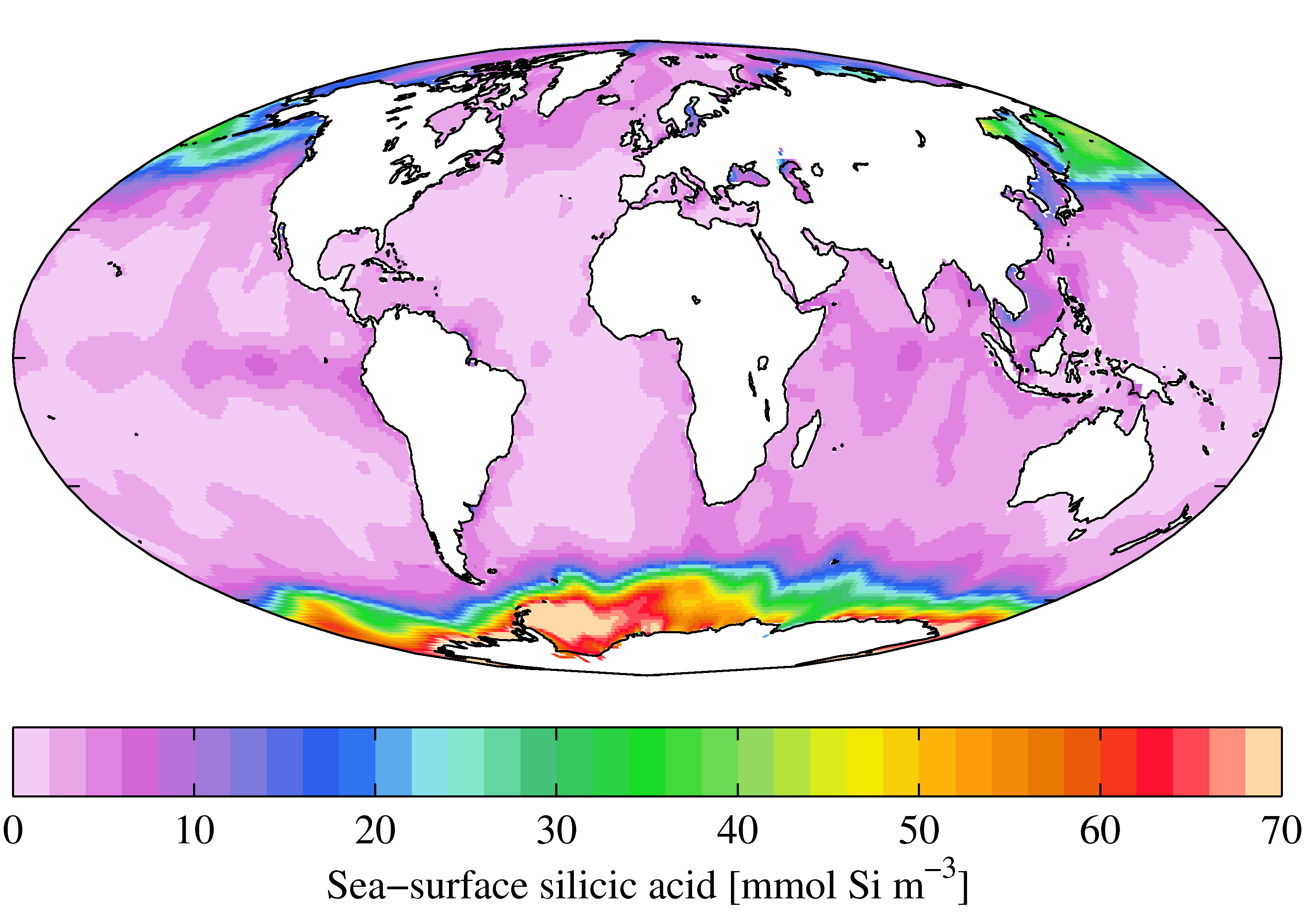
Concentration of silicic acid in the upper pelagic zone, showing high levels in the Southern Ocean

== Role in climate regulation ==
The silica cycle plays an important role in long term global climate regulation. The global silica cycle also has large effects on the global carbon cycle through the carbonate-silicate cycle. The process of silicate mineral weathering transfers atmospheric CO_{2} to the hydrologic cycle through the chemical reaction displayed above. Over geologic timescales, the rates of weathering change due to tectonic activity. During a time of high uplift rate, silicate weathering increases which results in high CO_{2} uptake rates, offsetting increased volcanic CO_{2} emissions associated with the geologic activity. This balance of weathering and volcanoes is part of what controls the greenhouse effect and ocean pH over geologic time scales.

Biogenic silica accumulation on the sea floor contains lot of information about where in the ocean export production has occurred on time scales ranging from hundreds to millions of years. For this reason, opal deposition records provide valuable information regarding large-scale oceanographic reorganizations in the geological past, as well as paleoproductivity. The mean oceanic residence time for silicate is approximately 10,000–15,000 yr. This relative short residence time, makes oceanic silicate concentrations and fluxes sensitive to glacial/interglacial perturbations, and thus an excellent proxy for evaluating climate changes.

Isotope ratios of oxygen (O^{18}:O^{16}) and silicon (Si^{30}:Si^{28}) are analysed from biogenic silica preserved in lake and marine sediments to derive records of past climate change and nutrient cycling (De La Rocha, 2006; Leng and Barker, 2006). This is a particularly valuable approach considering the role of diatoms in global carbon cycling. In addition, isotope analyses from BSi are useful for tracing past climate changes in regions such as in the Southern Ocean, where few biogenic carbonates are preserved.

The silicon isotope compositions in fossil sponge spicules (δ30Si) are being increasingly often used to estimate the level of silicic acid in marine settings throughout the geological history, which enables the reconstruction of past silica cycles.

== See also ==
- Carbon cycle
- Lithogenic silica
- Oxygen cycle
- Silicification
- Silicon isotope biogeochemistry
