= Pelagic sediment =

Fine-grained sediment that accumulates on the floor of the open ocean

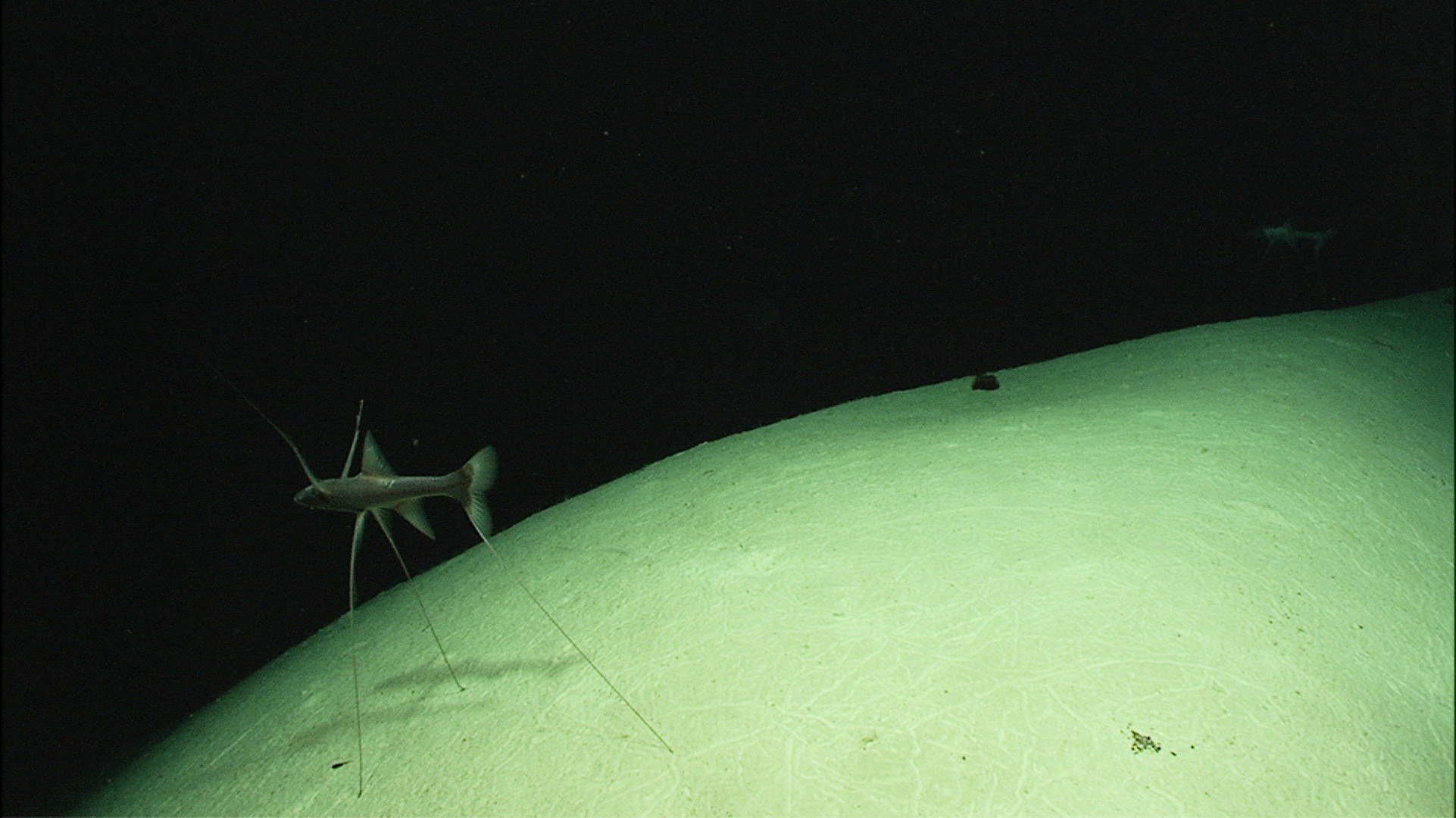
Tripodfish on pelagic sediment

Pelagic sediment or pelagite is a fine-grained sediment that accumulates as the result of the settling of particles to the floor of the open ocean, far from land. These particles consist primarily of either the microscopic, calcareous or siliceous shells of phytoplankton or zooplankton; clay-size siliciclastic sediment; or some mixture of these, along with detritus (marine snow) included. Trace amounts of meteoric dust and variable amounts of volcanic ash also occur within pelagic sediments. Based upon the composition of the ooze, there are three main types of pelagic sediments: siliceous oozes, calcareous oozes, and red clays.

The composition of pelagic sediments is controlled by three main factors. The first factor is the distance from major landmasses, which affects their dilution by terrigenous, or land-derived, sediment. The second factor is water depth, which affects the preservation of both siliceous and calcareous biogenic particles as they settle to the ocean bottom. The final factor is ocean fertility, which controls the amount of biogenic particles produced in surface waters.

== Oozes ==
In case of marine sediments, ooze does not refer to a sediment's consistency, but to its composition, which directly reflects its origin. Ooze is pelagic sediment that consists of at least 30% of microscopic remains of either calcareous or siliceous planktonic debris organisms. The remainder typically consists almost entirely of clay minerals. As a result, the grain size of oozes is often bimodal with a well-defined biogenic silt- to sand-size fraction and siliciclastic clay-size fraction. Oozes can be defined by and classified according to the predominant organisms that compose them. For example, there are diatom, coccolith, foraminifera, globigerina, pteropod, and radiolarian oozes. Oozes are also classified and named according to their mineralogy, i.e. calcareous or siliceous oozes. Regardless of their composition, all oozes accumulate extremely slowly, at no more than a few centimeters per millennium.

Calcareous ooze is ooze that is composed of at least 30% of the calcareous microscopic shells—also known as tests—of foraminifera, coccolithophores, and pteropods. This is the most common pelagic sediment by area, covering 48% of the world ocean's floor. This type of ooze accumulates on the ocean floor at depths above the carbonate compensation depth. It accumulates more rapidly than any other pelagic sediment type, with a rate that varies from 0.3–5 cm/1000 yr.

Siliceous ooze is ooze that is composed of at least 30% of the siliceous microscopic "shells" of plankton, such as diatoms and radiolaria. Siliceous oozes often contain lesser proportions of either sponge spicules, silicoflagellates or both. This type of ooze accumulates on the ocean floor at depths below the carbonate compensation depth. Its distribution is also limited to areas with high biological productivity, such as the polar oceans, and upwelling zones near the equator. The least common type of sediment, it covers only 15% of the ocean floor. It accumulates at a slower rate than calcareous ooze: 0.2–1 cm/1000 yr.

== Red and brown clays ==
Red clay, also known as either brown clay or pelagic clay, accumulates in the deepest and most remote areas of the ocean. It covers 38% of the ocean floor and accumulates more slowly than any other sediment type, at only 0.1–0.5 cm/1000 yr. Containing less than 30% biogenic material, it consists of sediment that remains after the dissolution of both calcareous and siliceous biogenic particles while they settled through the water column. These sediments consist of aeolian quartz, clay minerals, volcanic ash, subordinate residue of siliceous microfossils, and authigenic minerals such as zeolites, limonite and manganese oxides. The bulk of red clay consists of eolian dust. Accessory constituents found in red clay include meteorite dust, fish bones and teeth, whale ear bones, and manganese micro-nodules.

These pelagic sediments are typically bright red to chocolate brown in color. The color results from coatings of iron and manganese oxide on the sediment particles. In the absence of organic carbon, iron and manganese remain in their oxidized states and these clays remain brown after burial. When more deeply buried, brown clay may change into red clay due to the conversion of iron-hydroxides to hematite.

These sediments accumulate on the ocean floor within areas characterized by little planktonic production. The clays which comprise them were transported into the deep ocean in suspension, either in the air over the oceans or in surface waters. Both wind and ocean currents transported these sediments in suspension thousands of kilometers from their terrestrial source. As they were transported, the finer clays may have stayed in suspension for a hundred years or more within the water column before they settled to the ocean bottom. The settling of this clay-size sediment occurred primarily by the formation of clay aggregates by flocculation and by their incorporation into fecal pellets by pelagic organisms.

== Distribution and average thickness of marine sediments ==
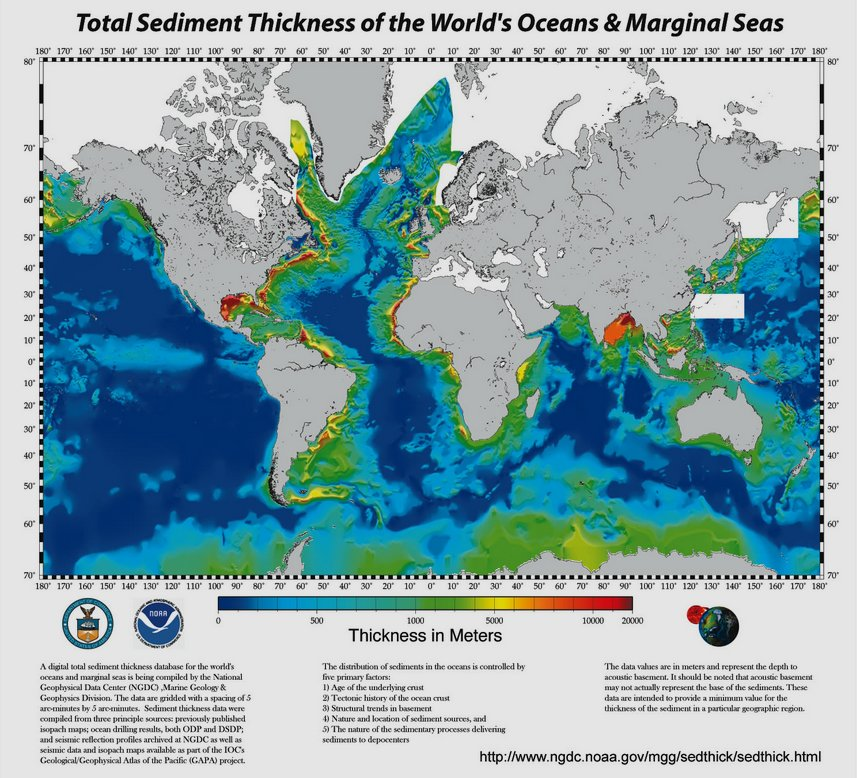
Total sediment thickness of the ocean floor Deposits are thick on the continental shelves, and thinnest in the deep sea on either side of the mid-ocean ridge.

Region	Percent of ocean area	Percent of total volume of marine sediments	Average thickness
Continental shelves	9%	15%	2.5 km (1.6 mi)
Continental slopes	6%	41%	9 km (5.6 mi)
Continental rises	6%	31%	8 km (5 mi)
Deep-ocean floor	78%	13%	0.6 km (0.4 mi)

== Classification of marine sediments by source of particles ==
Sediment type	Source	Examples	Distribution	Percent of all ocean floor area covered
Terrigenous	Erosion of land, volcanic eruptions, blown dust	Quartz sand, clays, estuarine mud	Dominant on continental margins, abyssal plains, polar ocean floors	~45%
Biogenous	Organic; accumulation of hard parts of some marine organisms	Calcareous and siliceous oozes	Dominant on deep-ocean floor (siliceous ooze below about 5 km)	~55%
Hydrogenous (authigenic)	Precipitation of dissolved mineral from water, often by bacteria	Manganese nodules, phosphorite deposits	Present with other, more dominant sediments	1%
Cosmogenous	Dust from space, meteorite debris	Tektite spheres, glassy nodules	Mixed in very small proportion with more dominant sediments	1%

== See also ==
- Chalk
- Diatomaceous earth
- Marine geology
- Petrological Database of the Ocean Floor
- Radiolarite
- SedDB, online database for sediment geochemistry
- Biogenous ooze
