= Brown clay (disambiguation) =

Brown clay or Brown Clay may refer to:

- Brown clay
- Another name of pelagic clay, is a type of pelagic sediment
- James Brown Clay, American politician
- Umber
