= Silicon isotope biogeochemistry =

Study of environmental processes using abundances of isotopes

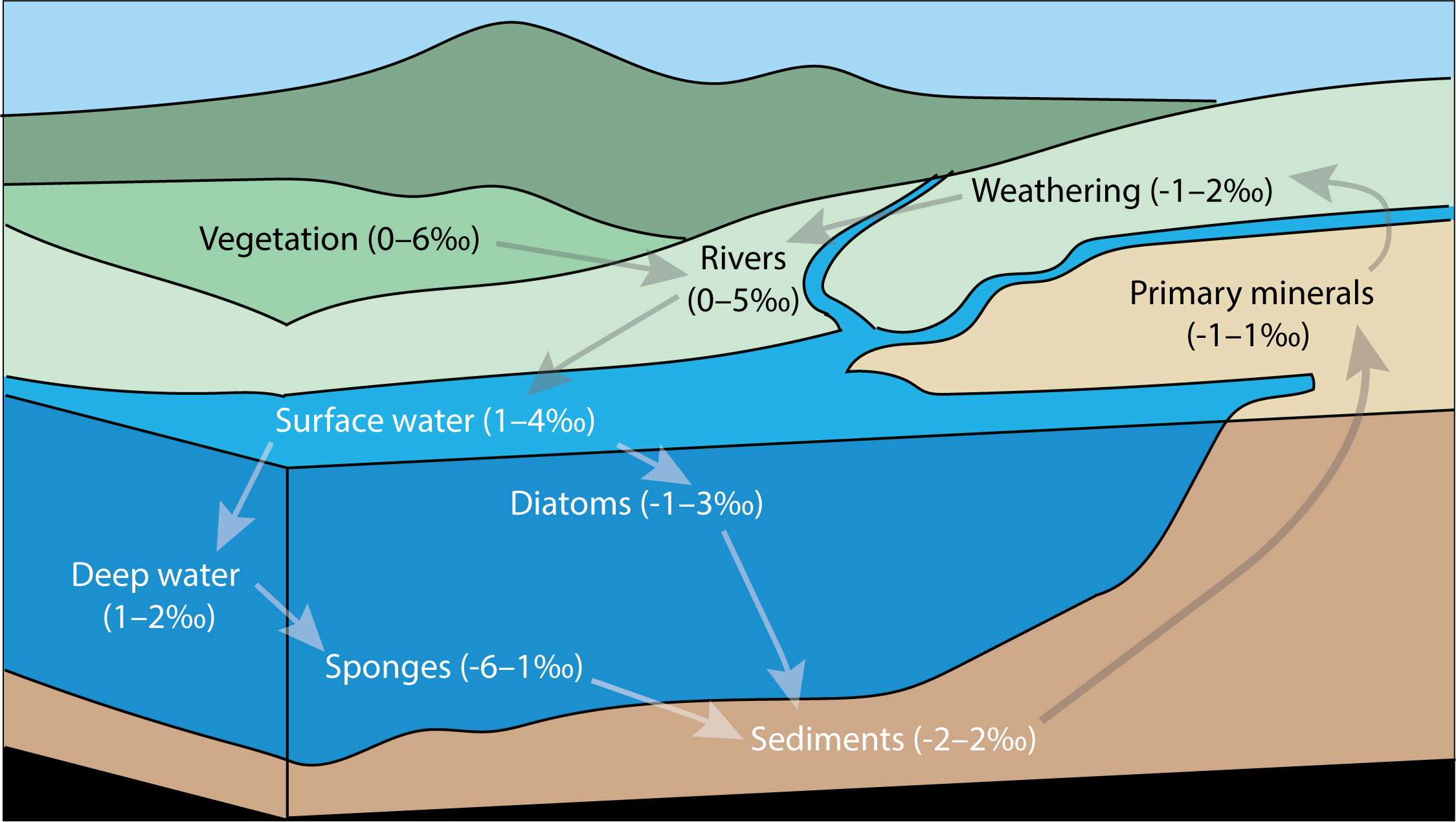
Figure 1: A schematic illustration of the Si biogeochemical cycle and the Si stable isotope values (δ^{30}Si) associated with specific reservoirs and processes (in parentheses, in units of permil). The data in the illustration is based on the supplementary database in Sutton et al. (2018).

Silicon isotope biogeochemistry is the study of environmental processes using the relative abundance of Si isotopes. As the relative abundance of Si stable isotopes varies among different natural materials, the differences in abundance can be used to trace the source of Si, and to study biological, geological, and chemical processes. The study of stable isotope biogeochemistry of Si aims to quantify the different Si fluxes in the global biogeochemical silicon cycle, to understand the role of biogenic silica within the global Si cycle, and to investigate the applications and limitations of the sedimentary Si record as an environmental and palaeoceanographic proxy.

== Background ==
Silicon in nature is typically bonded to oxygen, in a tetravalent oxidation state. The major forms of solid Si are silicate minerals and amorphous silica, whereas in aqueous solutions the dominant forms are orthosilicic acid and its dissociated species. There are three stable isotopes of Si, associated with the following mean natural abundances: ^{28}Si– 92.23%, ^{29}Si– 4.67%, and ^{30}Si– 3.10%. The isotopic composition of Si is often formulated by the delta notation, as the following:

$$\delta^{30}Si = {({^{30}Si \over ^{28}Si})_{sample}\over ({^{30}Si \over ^{28}Si})_{standard}}-1$$

The reference material (standard) for defining the δ^{30}Si of a sample is the National Bureau of Standards (NBS) 28 Sand Quartz, which has been certified and distributed by the National Institute of Standards and Technology (NIST), and is also named NIST RM 8546. Currently, there are four main analytical methods for the measurement of Si isotopes: Gas Source Isotope-Ratio Mass Spectrometry (GC-IRMS), Secondary Ion Mass Spectrometry (SIMS), Multi-Collector Inductively Coupled Plasma Mass Spectrometry (MC–IPC–MS), and Laser Ablation MC–ICP–MS.

== Si isotopes in the Si biogeochemical cycle ==
=== Primary minerals and weathering ===
Primary minerals are the minerals that crystalize during the formation of Earth's crust, and their typical δ^{30}Si isotopic value is in the range of −0.9‰ – +1.4‰. Earth's crust is constantly undergoing weathering processes, which dissolve Si and produce secondary Si minerals simultaneously. The formation of secondary Si discriminates against the heavy Si isotope (^{30}Si), creating minerals with relatively low δ^{30}Si isotopic values (−3‰ – +2.5‰, mean: −1.1‰). It has been suggested that this isotopic fractionation is controlled by the kinetic isotope effect of Si adsorption to Aluminum hydroxides, which takes place in early stages of weathering. As a result of incorporation of lighter Si isotopes into secondary minerals, the remaining dissolved Si will be relative enriched in the heavy Si isotope (^{30}Si), and associated with relatively high δ^{30}Si isotopic values (−1‰ – +2‰, mean: +0.8‰). The dissolved Si is often transported by rivers to the oceans.

=== Terrestrial vegetation ===
Silicon uptake by plants typically discriminates against the light Si isotope, forming ^{30}Si-enriched plants (δ^{30}Si of 0–6‰). The reason for this relatively large isotopic fractionation remains unclear, mainly because the mechanisms of Si uptake by plants are yet to be understood. Silicon in plants can be found in the xylem, which is associated with exceptionally high δ^{30}Si values. Phytoliths, microscopic structures of silica in plant tissues, have relatively lower δ^{30}Si values. For example, it was reported that the mean δ^{30}Si of phytoliths in various wheat organs were -1.4–2.1‰, which is lower than the typical range for vegetation (δ^{30}Si of 0–6‰). Phytoliths are relatively soluble, and as plants decay they contribute to the terrestrial dissolved Si budget.

=== Biomineralization in aquatic environments ===
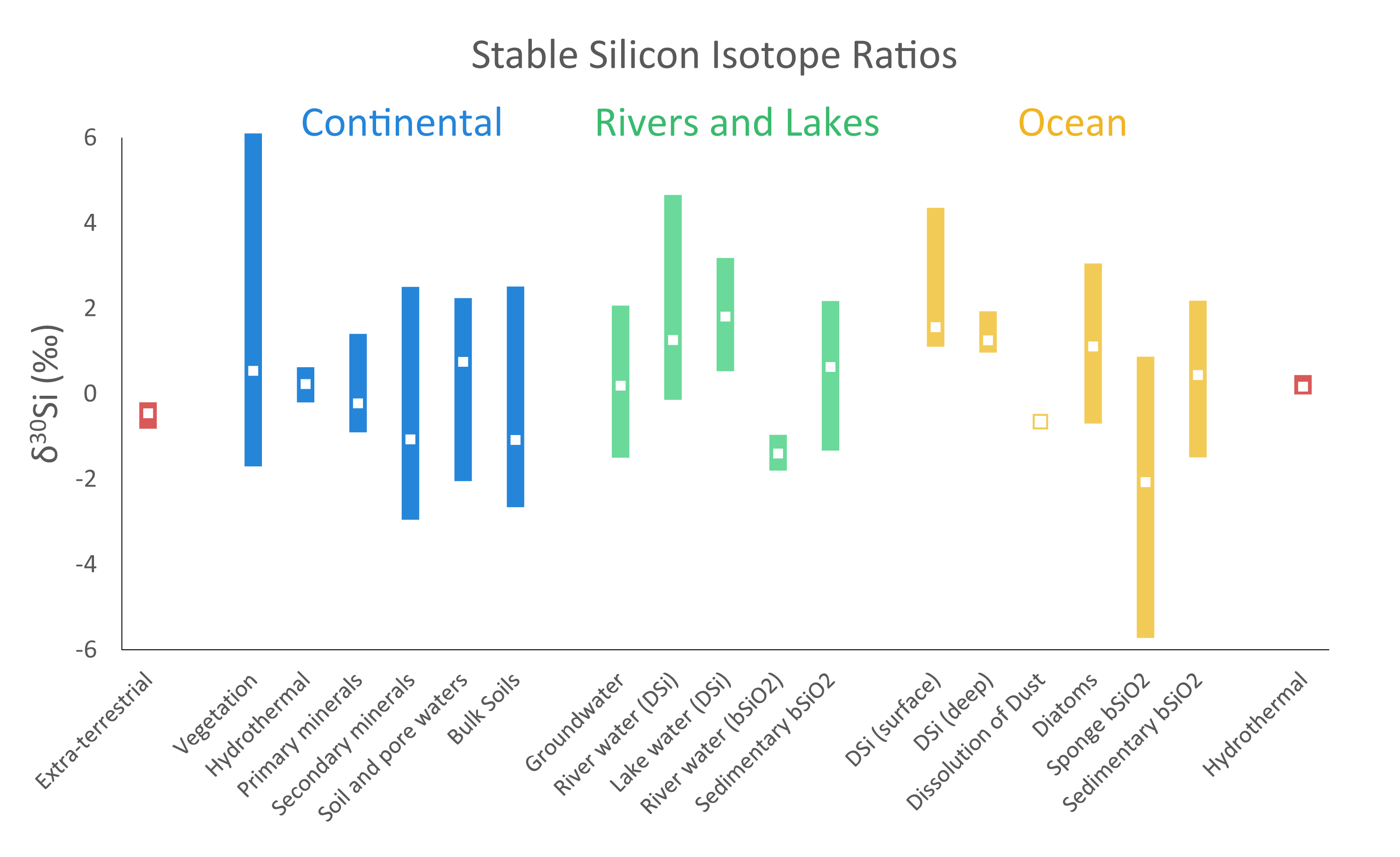
Figure 2: The typical silicon (Si) stable isotope values (δ^{30}Si) of different Si reservoirs (in units of permil). White squares denote the average value, bars denote the range between minimum and maximum values, following the supplementary database published in Sutton et al. (2018).

In aquatic environments (rivers, lakes and ocean), dissolved Si is utilized by diatoms, dictyochales, radiolarians and sponges to produce solid bSiO_{2} structures. The biomineralized silica has an amorphous structure and therefore its properties may vary among the different organisms. Biomineralization by diatoms induces the largest Si flux within the ocean, and thus it has a crucial role in the global Si cycle. During Si uptake by diatoms, there is an isotopic discrimination against the heavy isotope, forming ^{30}Si-depleted biogenic silica minerals. As a result, the remaining dissolved Si in the surrounding water is ^{30}Si-enriched. Since diatoms rely on sunlight for photosynthesis, they inhabit in surface waters, and thus the surface water of the ocean are typically ^{30}Si-enriched. Although there is less available data on the isotopic fractionation during biomineralization by radiolarians, it has been suggested that radiolarians also discriminate against the heavy isotope (^{30}Si), and that the magnitude of isotopic fractionation is of a similar range as biomineralization by diatoms. Sponges also show an isotopic preference for ^{28}Si over ^{30}Si, but the magnitude of their isotopic fractionation is often larger (For quantitative comparation, see Figure 2).

=== Hydrothermal vents ===
Hydrothermal vents contribute dissolved Si to the ocean Si reservoir. Currently, it is challenging to determine the magnitude of hydrothermal Si fluxes, due to lack of data on the δ^{30}Si values associated with this flux. There are only two published data points of the δ^{30}Si value of hydrothermal vents (−0.4‰ and −0.2‰).

=== Diagenesis ===
The δ^{30}Si value of sediment porewater may be affected by post-depositional (diagenetic) precipitation or dissolution of Si. It is important to understand the extent and isotopic fractionations of these processes, as they alter the δ^{30}Si values of the originally deposited sediments, and determine the δ^{30}Si preserved in the rock record. Generally, precipitation of Si prefers the light isotope (^{28}Si) and leads to ^{30}Si-enriched dissolved Si in the hosting solution. The isotopic effect of Si dissolution in porewater is yet to be clear, as some studies report a preference for ^{28}Si during dissolution, while other studies document that isotopic fractionation was not expressed during dissolution of sediments.

== Paleoceanography proxies ==
=== The silicic acid leakage hypothesis ===
The silicic acid leakage hypothesis (SALH) is a suggested mechanism that aims to explain the atmospheric CO_{2} variations between glacial and interglacial periods. This hypothesis proposes that during glacial periods, as a result of enhanced dust deposition in the southern ocean, diatoms consume less Si relative to nitrogen. The decrease in the Si:N uptake ratios leads to Si excess in the southern ocean, which leaks to lower latitudes of the ocean that are dominated by coccolithophores. As the Si concentrations rise, the diatom population may outcompete the coccolithophores, reducing the CaCO_{3} precipitation and altering ocean alkalinity and the carbonate pump. These changes would induce a new ocean-atmosphere steady state with lower atmospheric CO_{2} concentrations, consistent with the draw down of CO_{2} observed in the last glacial period. The δ^{30}Si and δ^{15}N isotopic values archived in the southern ocean diatom sediments has been used to examine this hypothesis, as the dynamics of Si and N supply and utilization during the last deglaciation could be interpreted from this record. In alignment with the silicic acid leakage hypothesis, these isotopic archives suggest that Si utilization in the southern ocean increased during the deglaciation.

=== Si isotope palaeothermometry ===
There have been attempts to reconstruct ocean paleotemperatures by chert Si isotopic record, which proposed that the Archean seawater temperatures were significantly higher than modern (~70 °C). However, subsequent studies question this palaeothermometry method and offer alternative explanation for the δ^{30}Si values of Archean rocks. These signals could result from diagenetic alteration processes that overprint the original δ^{30}Si values, or reflect that Archean cherts were composed of different Si sources. It is plausible that in during the Archean the dominant sources of Si sediments were weathering, erosion, silicification of clastic sediments or hydrothermal activity, in contrast to the vast SiO_{2} biomineralization in the modern ocean.

=== Paleo Si concentrations ===
According to empirical calibrations, the difference in δ^{30}Si (denoted as Δ^{30}Si) between sponges and their hosting water is correlated with the Si concentration of the hosting solution. Therefore, it has been suggested that the Si concentrations in bottom waters of ancient oceans can be interpreted from the δ^{30}Si of coexisting sponge spicules, which are preserved in the rock record. It has been proposed that this relation is determined by the growth rate and the Si uptake kinetics of sponges, but the current understanding of sponge biomineralization pathways is limited. Although the mechanism behind this relation is yet to be clear, it appears consistent among various laboratory experiments, modern environments, and core top sediments. However, there is also evidence that the δ^{30}Si of carnivorous sponges may differ significantly from the expected correlation.

== See also ==
- Isotopes of silicon
- Isotope geochemistry
- Stable isotope ratio
- Isotope-ratio mass spectrometry
