= Pelagic red clay =

Slow accumulating oceanic sediment with low biogenic constituents

Pelagic red clay, also known as simply red clay, brown clay or pelagic clay, is a type of pelagic sediment.

Pelagic clay accumulates in the deepest and most remote areas of the ocean. It covers 38% of the ocean floor and accumulates more slowly than any other sediment type, at only 0.1–0.5 cm/1000 yr. Containing less than 30% biogenic material, it consists of sediment that remains after the dissolution of both calcareous and siliceous biogenic particles while they settled through the water column. These sediments consist of eolian quartz, clay minerals, volcanic ash, subordinate residue of siliceous microfossils, and authigenic minerals such as zeolites, limonite and manganese oxides. The bulk of red clay consists of eolian dust. Accessory constituents found in red clay include meteorite dust, fish bones and teeth, whale ear bones, and manganese micro-nodules.

These pelagic sediments are typically bright red to chocolate brown in color. The color results from coatings of iron oxide and manganese oxide on the sediment particles. In the absence of organic carbon, iron and manganese remain in their oxidized states and these clays remain brown after burial. When more deeply buried, brown clay may change into red clay due to the conversion of iron hydroxides to hematite.

These sediments accumulate on the ocean floor within areas characterized by little planktonic production. The clays which comprise them are transported into the deep ocean in suspension, either in the air over the oceans or in surface waters. Both wind and ocean currents transport these sediments in suspension thousands of kilometers from their terrestrial source. As they are transported, the finer clays may stay in suspension for a hundred years or more within the water column before they settle to the ocean bottom. The settling of this clay-size sediment occurs primarily by the formation of clay aggregates by flocculation and by their incorporation into fecal pellets by pelagic organisms.
