= Biogenous ooze =

Category of sediment

Biogenous ooze is marine sediment that accumulates on the seafloor and is a byproduct of the death and sinking of the skeletal remains of marine organisms.

== Formation and composition ==
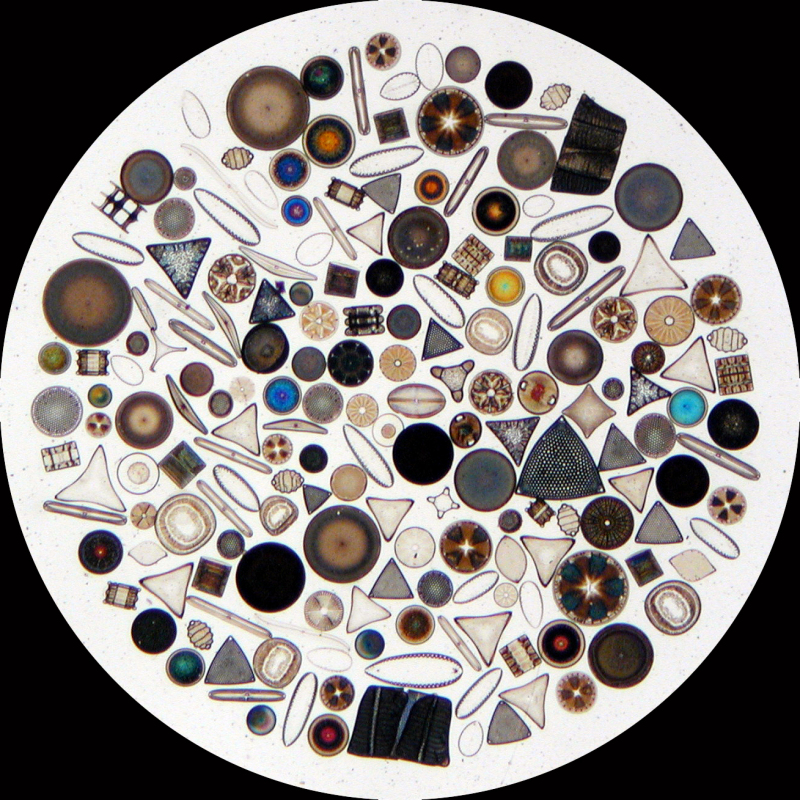
Diatoms

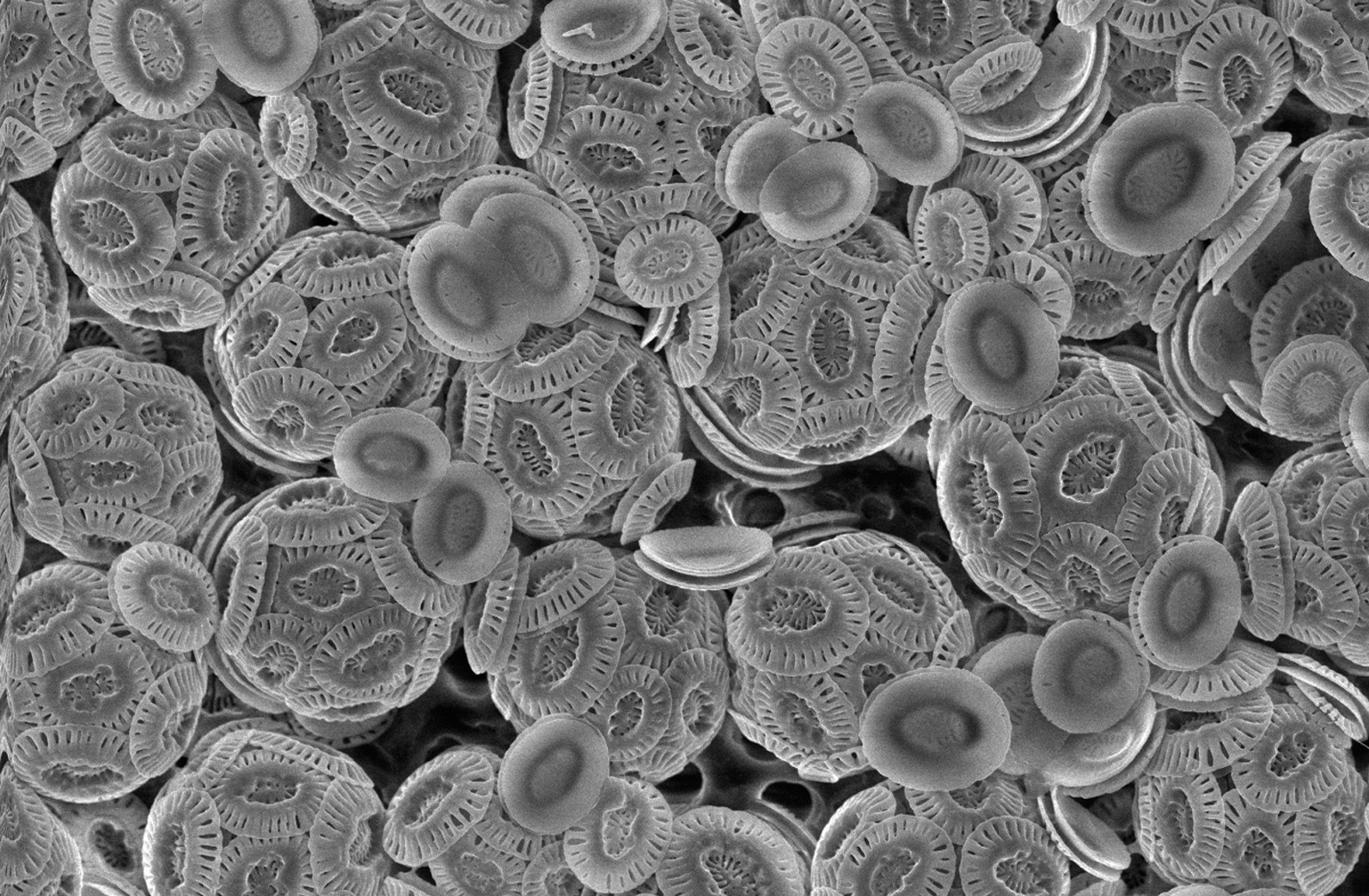
Coccolithophores

Biogenous ooze consists of organic compounds, usually in the form of microorganism tests that fall from closer to the ocean surface to the ocean floor after death. For marine sediment to receive this classification, it must be composed of more than 30% skeletal material which also includes teeth and shells.

== Types of biogenous sediments ==
The two primary types of ooze are siliceous, which is composed primarily of silica (SiO_{2}), and calcareous or carbonate, which is mostly calcium carbonate (CaCO_{3}). In an area in which biogenous is the dominant sediment type, the composition of microorganisms in that location determines to which category it is classified. The primary types of microorganisms used to classify ooze are radiolarians and diatoms (siliceous), and coccolithophores and foraminifera (calcareous). The presence of these organisms can lead to sub-classifications based upon their dominance.

=== Siliceous ===
Along some areas of terrigenous sediment are siliceous ooze. This is due to siliceous ooze being more abundant in areas of cooler, more nutrient rich water. The nutrients allow for the abundant growth of microorganisms, and silica dissolves slower in cooler water, allowing adequate time for deposition.

Radiolarians and diatoms are the primary plankton used to classify siliceous ooze. Radiolaria is a part of a diverse group of plankton with transparent skeletons and come in a variety of shapes. They range in size from 20–400 μm (0.020–0.400 mm). They are most abundant in regions near the equator as well as subpolar regions. Diatoms are single-celled siliceous algae that are a major part of phytoplankton. They come in pennate and centric shapes and range in size from 10–100 μm (0.010–0.100 mm).

Siliceous oozes lean towards dissolution in warmer waters with lower pressures, meaning they are best preserved in deep ocean.

=== Calcareous ===
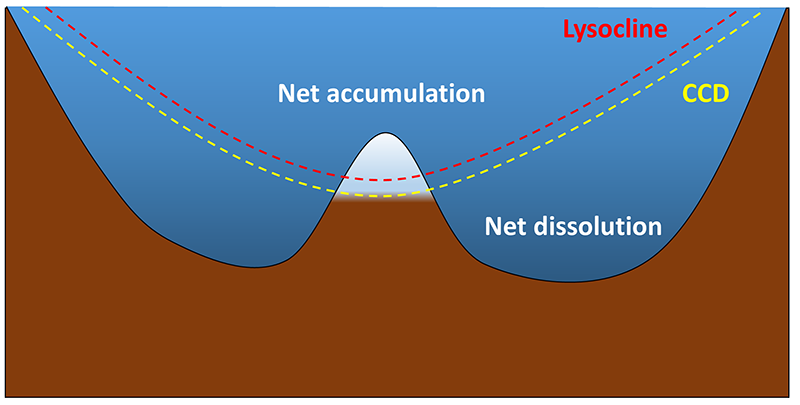
Calcareous sediment in the ocean

Calcareous sediments are more common in the deep ocean, comprising about half of its surface area. However, the deepest parts of the ocean are dominated by abyssal clay instead.

Calcareous debris are mostly composed of forminiferal ooze and make about almost 50% of sediments on the seafloor. Calcareous oozes also have a terrigenous fraction made up of quartz and clay minerals.

This is because calcareous ooze is limited by the calcite compensation depth (CCD). The CCD refers to the depth at which the rate of supply of calcareous deposits equal the rate of dissolution and varies around the world and is based upon temperature. The CCD occurs at approximately 4000-5000 meters deep because calcium carbonate dissolves faster in cooler water, so as water temperature decreases with depth, its deposition rate also decreases. The temperature dependence also means that calcareous ooze is more likely to be present in warmer waters, which also leads to its dominance in shallow areas surrounding tropical and subtropical islands that do not have much terrigenous sediment runoff.

Another important depth is the lysocline, also known as the depth where well preserved calcareous grain are separated from poorly preserved ones. The lysocline occurs at approximately 3,000–5,000 metres (1.9–3.1 mi) deep. Calcareous grains above the lysocline are able to accumulate without threat of dissolution.

== Distribution ==
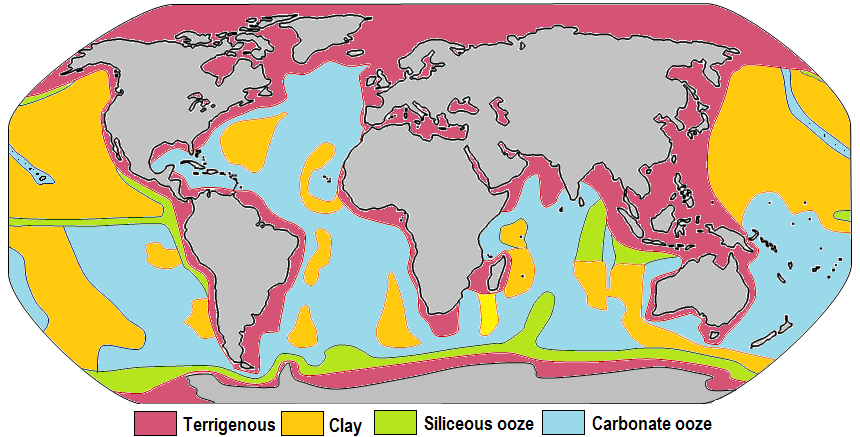
Global map of marine sediment distribution

Despite the common association between shallow water and high productivity, biogenous ooze is not as common around continental shelves. This is due to the transport of terrigenous sediments by methods such as rivers and wind from the continents. The terrigenous sediment buries most accumulated organic material, preventing enough biological material from being present for it to be classified as biogenous.

Distribution of biogenous sediments is determined by three factors:

1. Distance from continents and land masses, the closer these sediments are to land masses the higher the likelihood of being diluted by terrigenous materials
2. Water depth, which affects the likelihood of preservation of the sediments
3. Ocean fertility, which helps dictate productivity in surface oceans

Accumulation rate of biogenous ooze is about 1cm per 1000 years.

== Determination of climate history ==
In the fields of paleoceanography and paleoclimatology, biogenous ooze and other pelagic sediments can be collected form the seafloor and used to reconstruct Earth's climate for the last 100 million years.

Reconstruction can be done through analysis of biogeography, stable isotopes along with important oxygen and carbon isotopes.
