= Lithogenic silica =

Silica that originates from terrestrial sources of rock and soil

Lithogenic silica (LSi) is silica (SiO_{2}) derived from terrigenous rock (Igneous, metamorphic, and sedimentary), lithogenic sediments composed of the detritus of pre-existing rock, volcanic ejecta, extraterrestrial material, and minerals such silicate. Silica is the most abundant compound in the Earth's crust (59%) and the main component of almost every rock (>95%).

== Lithogenic Silica in Marine Systems ==
LSi can either be accumulated "directly" in marine sediments as clastic particles or be transferred into dissolved silica (DSi) in the water column. Within living marine systems, DSi is the most important form of silica Forms of DSi, such as silicic acid (Si(OH)_{4}), are utilized by silicoflagellates and radiolarians to create their mineral skeletons, and by diatoms to develop their frustules (external shells). These structures are vitally important, as they can protect, amplify light for photosynthesis, and even help keep these organisms afloat in the water column. DSi more readily forms from biogenic silica (BSi) than from LSi, as the latter is less soluble in water. However, LSi is still an important supply to the silica cycle, due to it being a primary supplier of silica to the water column.

=== Sources ===
Rivers are one of the major suppliers of LSi to marine environments. As they flow, rivers pick up fine particles, such as clays, silts, and sand, through physical weathering. Lithogenic silicic acid forms through chemical weathering, as CO_{2}-rich water comes into contact with silicate and aluminosilicate minerals from terrestrial rocks. The silicic acid is then transported to the river via runoff or groundwater flow before being transported to the ocean. Estimates of combined flux (both lithogenic and biogenic) report that about 6.2 ± 1.8 Tmol Si year^{−1} (Note: Tmol = Teramole =10^{12} mole) and 147 ¨ ± 44 Tmol Si year^{−1} of dissolved and particulate silica, respectively, enter estuaries.

Eolian transport occurs when wind picks up weathered particles, primarily lithogenic, and transports them into the atmosphere, from which they subsequently fall into the ocean. The solubility of the silica within such sediments depends on both the origin and composition of the material. For example, studies of Saharan sediment, which is mostly made of quartz, found a solubility range of 0.02%-1.1%, while some feldspar-rich sediment was estimated to have a solubility of about 10%. Eolian LSi can also accumulate in the atmosphere and fall as rain dust, a phenomenon in which raindrops contain macroscopic amounts of sediment. Dry deposition of LSi ranges from 2.8 to 4.6 Tmol Si year^{−1}, with about 0.5 ± 0.5 Tmol Si year^{−1} being transferred to DSi.

Seafloor inputs, including hydrothermal vents and low-temperature dissolution of basalt and other terrigenous marine sediments, represent considerable sources of lithogenic DSi. High-temperature fluids leach silicon from the oceanic crust as they rise toward the seafloor, accumulating great amounts of DSi. Hydrothermal inputs are divided into 2 categories: ridge axis, which originate directly from the mid-ocean ridges (350◦C ± 30◦C), and ridge flank, which are diffuse inputs away from the ridge (<75◦C). The latter loses much of its DSi to precipitation (as clays) as it cools. As a result, ridge flank dissolved LSi only enters the ocean at 0.07 ± 0.07 Tmol Si year^{−1}, compared to 0.5 ± 0.3 Tmol Si year^{−1} from ridge axis systems. In low temperature (<2◦C) conditions, seafloor basalt and lithogenic sediments can leach LSi directly into the seawater. Previous estimates that addressed seafloor basalt alone calculate a DSi flux of 0.4 ± 0.3 Tmol Si year^{−1}. More recent experiments adding lithogenic sediments (including clay, shale, basalt, and sand) to the calculation gave values of 1.9 ± 0.7 Tmol Si year^{−1}.

A 2019 study proposed that, in the surf zone of beaches, wave action disturbed abiotic sand grains and dissolved them over time. To test this, the researchers placed sand samples in closed containers with different kinds of water and rotated the containers to simulate wave action. They discovered that the higher the rock/water ratio within the container, and the faster the container spun, the more silica dissolved into solution. After analyzing and upscaling their results, they estimated that anywhere from 3.2 ± 1.0 – 5.0 ± 2.0 Tmol Si yr^{−1} of lithogenic DSi could enter the ocean from sandy beaches, a massive increase from a previous estimate of 0.3 Tmol Si yr^{−1}. If confirmed, this represents a significant input of dissolved LSi that was previously ignored.

== See also ==
- Biogenic silica
- Silica cycle
