= Siliceous ooze =

Biogenic pelagic sediment located on the deep ocean floor

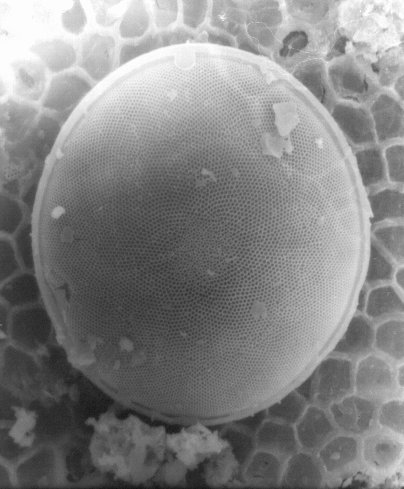
A centric diatom, magnified ×150

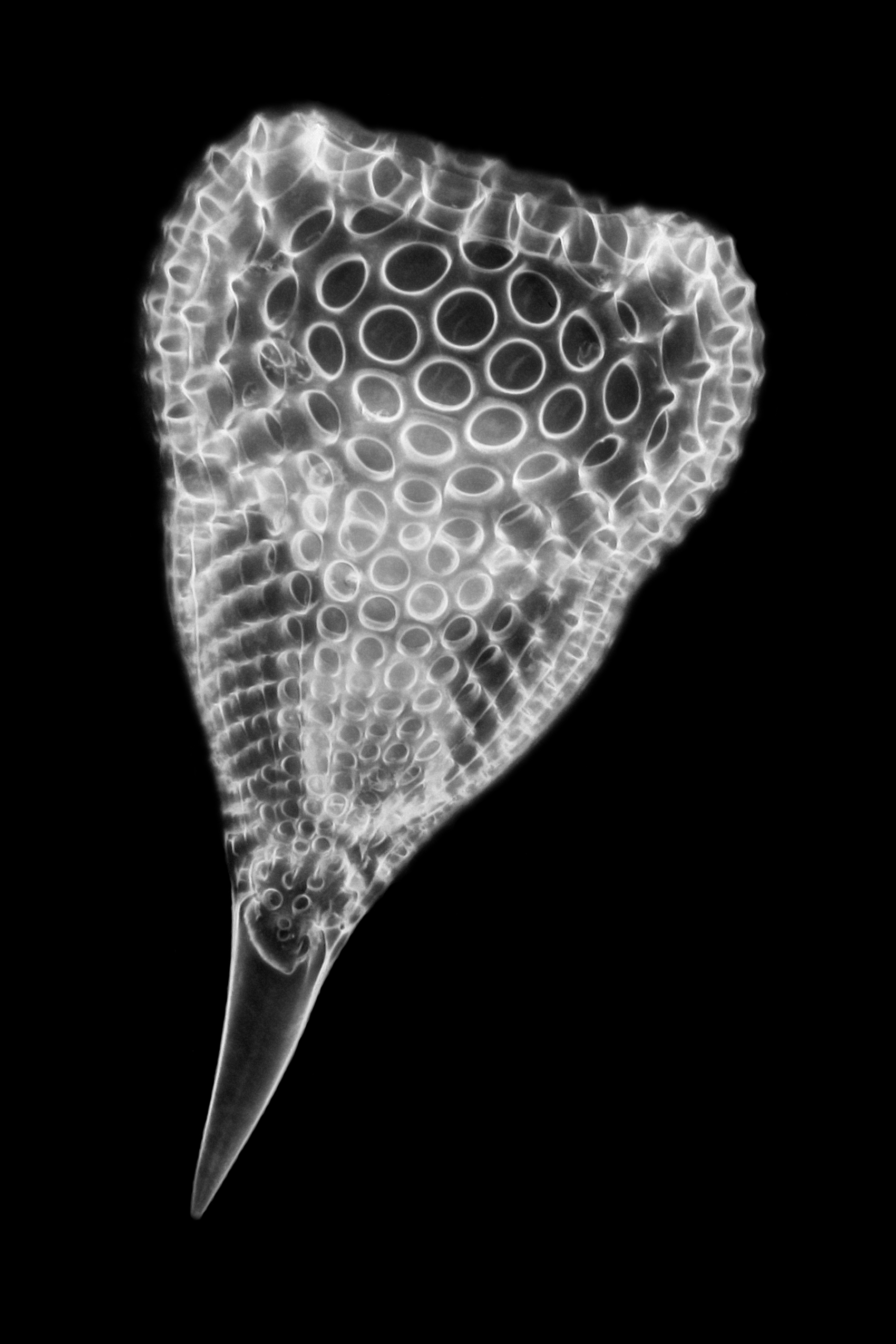
A radiolarian, magnified ×160

Siliceous ooze is a type of biogenic pelagic sediment located on the deep ocean floor. Siliceous oozes are the least common of the deep sea sediments, and make up approximately 15% of the ocean floor. Oozes are defined as sediments which contain at least 30% skeletal remains of pelagic microorganisms. Siliceous oozes are largely composed of the silica-based skeletons of microscopic marine organisms such as diatoms and radiolarians. Other components of siliceous oozes near continental margins may include terrestrially derived silica particles and sponge spicules. Siliceous oozes are composed of skeletons made from opal silica SiO_{2}·nH_{2}O, as opposed to calcareous oozes, which are made from skeletons of calcium carbonate (CaCO_{3}·nH_{2}O) organisms (i.e. coccolithophores). Silicon (Si) is a bioessential element and is efficiently recycled in the marine environment through the silica cycle. Distance from land masses, water depth and ocean fertility are all factors that affect the opal silica content in seawater and the presence of siliceous oozes.

== Formation ==
=== Biological uptake of marine silica ===
Siliceous marine organisms, such as diatoms and radiolarians, use silica to form skeletons through a process known as biomineralization. Diatoms and radiolarians have evolved to uptake silica in the form of silicic acid, Si(OH)_{4}. Once an organism has sequestered Si(OH)_{4} molecules in its cytoplasm, the molecules are transported to silica deposition vesicles, where they are transformed into opal silica (B-SiO_{2}). Diatoms and radiolarians have specialized proteins called silicon transporters that prevent mineralization during the sequestration and transportation of silicic acid within the organism.

The chemical formula for biological uptake of silicic acid is
$$\ce{H4SiO4(aq) <-> SiO2*\mathit{n}\,H2O(s){} + (2 - \mathit{n})H2O(l)}$$

=== Opal silica saturation state ===
The opal silica saturation state increases with depth in the ocean due to dissolution of sinking opal particles produced in surface ocean waters, but still remains low enough that the reaction to form biogenic opal silica remains thermodynamically unfavorable. Despite the unfavorable conditions, organisms can use dissolved silicic acid to make opal silica shells through biologically controlled biomineralization. The amount of opal silica that makes it to the seafloor is determined by the rates of sinking, dissolution, and water column depth.

=== Export of silica to the deep ocean ===
The dissolution rate of sinking opal silica (B-SiO_{2}) in the water column affects the formation of siliceous ooze on the ocean floor. The rate of dissolution of silica is dependent on the saturation state of opal silica in the water column and the dependent on re-packaging of opal silica particles within larger particles from the surface ocean. Re-packaging is the formation (and sometimes re-formation) of solid organic matter (usually fecal pellets) around opal silica. The organic matter protects against the immediate dissolution of opal silica into silicic acid, which allows for increased sedimentation of the seafloor. The opal compensation depth, similar to the carbonate compensation depth, occurs at approximately 6000 meters. Below this depth, there is greater dissolution of opal silica into silicic acid than formation of opal silica from silicic acid. Only four percent of opal silica produced in the surface ocean will, on average, be deposited to the seafloor, while the remaining 96% is recycled in the water column.

=== Accumulation rates ===
Siliceous oozes accumulate over long timescales. In the open ocean, siliceous ooze accumulates at a rate of approximately 0.01 mol Si m^{−2} yr^{−1}. The fastest accumulation rates of siliceous ooze occur in the deep waters of the Southern Ocean (0.1 mol Si m^{−2} yr^{−1}) where biogenic silica production and export is greatest. The diatom and radiolarian skeletons that make up Southern Ocean oozes can take 20 to 50 years to sink to the sea floor. Siliceous particles may sink faster if they are encased in the fecal pellets of larger organisms. Once deposited, silica continues to dissolve and cycle, delaying long term burial of particles until a depth of 10–20 cm in the sediment layer is reached.

=== Marine chert formation ===
When opal silica accumulates faster than it dissolves, it is buried and can provide a diagenetic environment for marine chert formation. The processes leading to chert formation have been observed in the Southern Ocean, where siliceous ooze accumulation is the fastest. Chert formation however can take tens of millions of years. Skeleton fragments from siliceous organisms are subject to recrystallization and cementation. Chert is the main fate of buried siliceous ooze and permanently removes silica from the oceanic silica cycle.

== Geographic locations ==
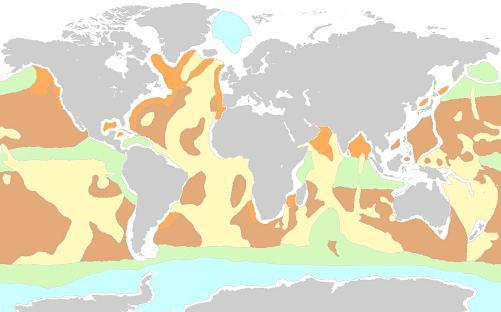
World map showing the distribution of pelagic sediments. Green: siliceous sediments. White: Sediments of the continental margin. Blue: glacial sediments. Orange: land-formed sediments. Brown: pelagic clay. Yellow: calcareous sediments.

Siliceous oozes form in upwelling areas that provide valuable nutrients for the growth of siliceous organisms living in oceanic surface waters. A notable example is in the Southern ocean, where the consistent upwelling of Indian, Pacific, and Antarctic circumpolar deep water has resulted in a contiguous siliceous ooze that stretches around the globe. There is a band of siliceous ooze that is the result of enhanced equatorial upwelling in Pacific Ocean sediments below the North Equatorial Current. In the subpolar North Pacific, upwelling occurs along the eastern and western sides of the basin from the Alaska current and the Oyashio Current. Siliceous ooze is present along the seafloor in these subpolar regions. Ocean basin boundary currents, such as the Humboldt Current and the Somali Current, are examples of other upwelling currents that favor the formation of siliceous ooze.

Siliceous ooze is usually categorized based upon its composition. Diatomaceous oozes are predominantly formed of diatom skeletons and are typically found along continental margins in higher latitudes. Diatomaceous oozes are present in the Southern Ocean and the North Pacific Ocean. Radiolarian oozes are made mostly of radiolarian skeletons and are located mainly in tropical equatorial and subtropical regions. Examples of radiolarian ooze are the oozes of the equatorial region, subtropical Pacific region, and the subtropical basin of the Indian Ocean. A small surface area of deep sea sediment is covered by radiolarian ooze in the equatorial East Atlantic basin.

== Role in the oceanic silica cycle ==
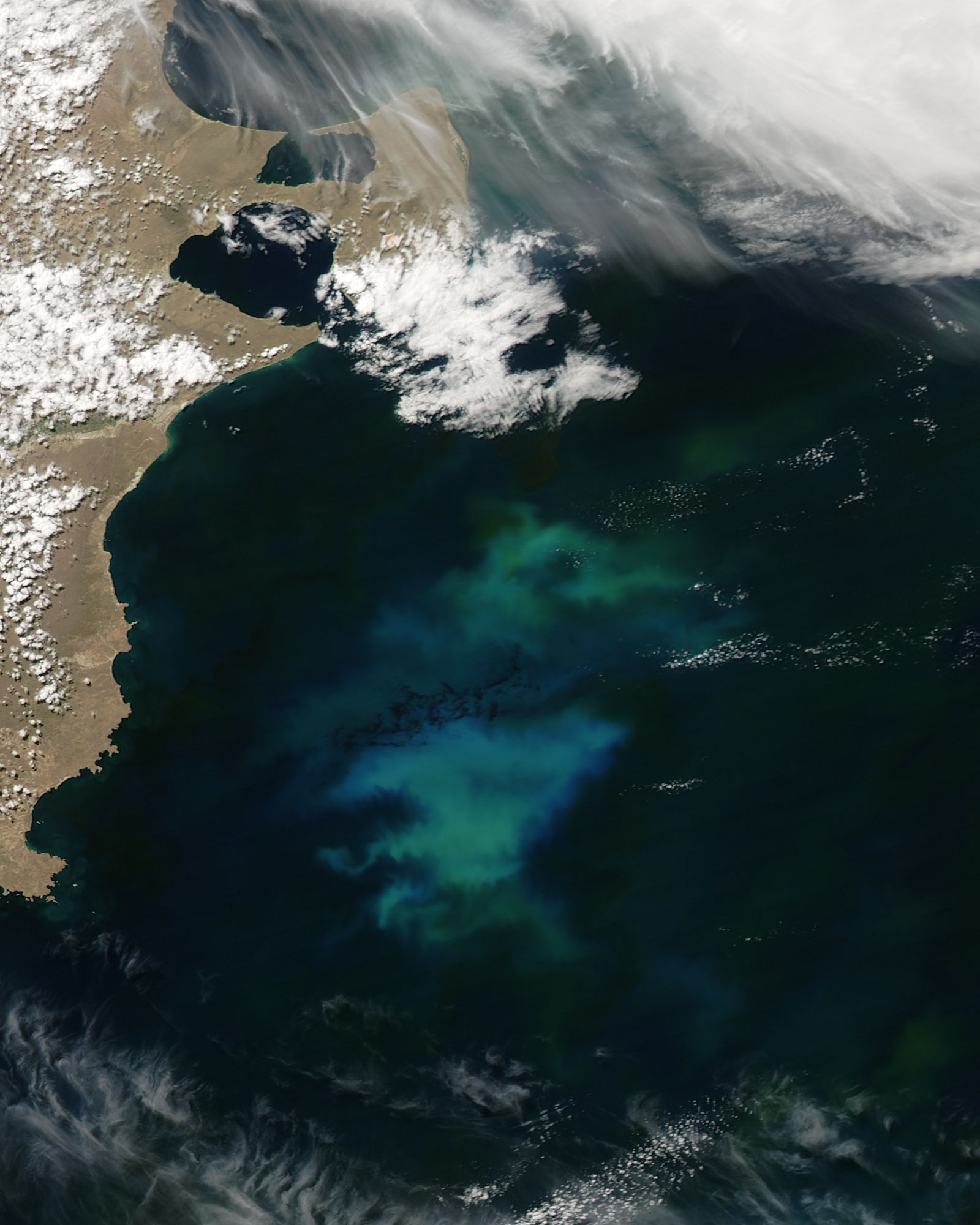
Diatom bloom in the South Atlantic Ocean, off the coast of Argentina

Deep seafloor deposition in the form of ooze is the largest long-term sink of the oceanic silica cycle (6.3 ± 3.6 Tmol Si year^{−1}). As noted above, this ooze is diagenetically transformed into lithospheric marine chert. This sink is roughly balanced by silicate weathering and river inputs of silicic acid into the ocean. Biogenic silica production in the photic zone is estimated to be 240 ± 40 Tmol si year ^{−1}. Rapid dissolution in the surface removes roughly 135 Tmol opal Si year^{−1}, converting it back to soluble silicic acid that can be used again for biomineralization. The remaining opal silica is exported to the deep ocean in sinking particles. In the deep ocean, another 26.2 Tmol Si Year^{−1} is dissolved before being deposited to the sediments as opal silica. At the sediment water interface, over 90% of the silica is recycled and upwelled for use again in the photic zone. The residence time on a biological timescale is estimated to be about 400 years, with each molecule of silica recycled 25 times before sediment burial.

== Siliceous oozes and carbon sequestration ==
Diatoms are primary producers that convert carbon dioxide into organic carbon via photosynthesis, and export organic carbon from the surface ocean to the deep sea via the biological pump. Diatoms can therefore be a significant sink for carbon dioxide in surface waters. Due to the relatively large size of diatoms (when compared to other phytoplankton), they are able to take up more total carbon dioxide. Additionally, diatoms do not release carbon dioxide into the environment during formation of their opal silicate shells. Phytoplankton that build calcium-carbonate shells (i.e. coccolithophores) release carbon dioxide as a byproduct during shell formation, making them a less efficient sink for carbon dioxide. The opal silicate skeletons enhance the sinking velocity of diatomaceous particles (i.e. carbon) from the surface ocean to the seafloor.

=== Iron fertilization experiments ===
Atmospheric carbon dioxide levels have been increasing exponentially since the Industrial Revolution and researchers are exploring ways to mitigate atmospheric carbon dioxide levels by increasing the uptake of carbon dioxide in the surface ocean via photosynthesis. An increase in the uptake of carbon dioxide in the surface waters may lead to more carbon sequestration in the deep sea through the biological pump. The bloom dynamics of diatoms, their ballasting by opal silica, and various nutrient requirements have made diatoms a focus for carbon sequestration experiments.

Iron fertilization projects like the SERIES iron-enrichment experiments have introduced iron into ocean basins to test if this increases the rate of carbon dioxide uptake by diatoms and ultimately sinking it to the deep ocean. Iron is a limiting nutrient for diatom photosynthesis in high-nutrient, low-chlorophyll areas of the ocean, thus increasing the amount of available iron can lead to a subsequent increase in photosynthesis, sometimes resulting in a diatom bloom. This increase removes more carbon dioxide from the atmosphere. Although more carbon dioxide is being taken up, the carbon sequestration rate in deep sea sediments is generally low. Most of the carbon dioxide taken up during the process of photosynthesis is recycled within the surface layer several times before making it to the deep ocean to be sequestered.

== Paleo-oozes ==
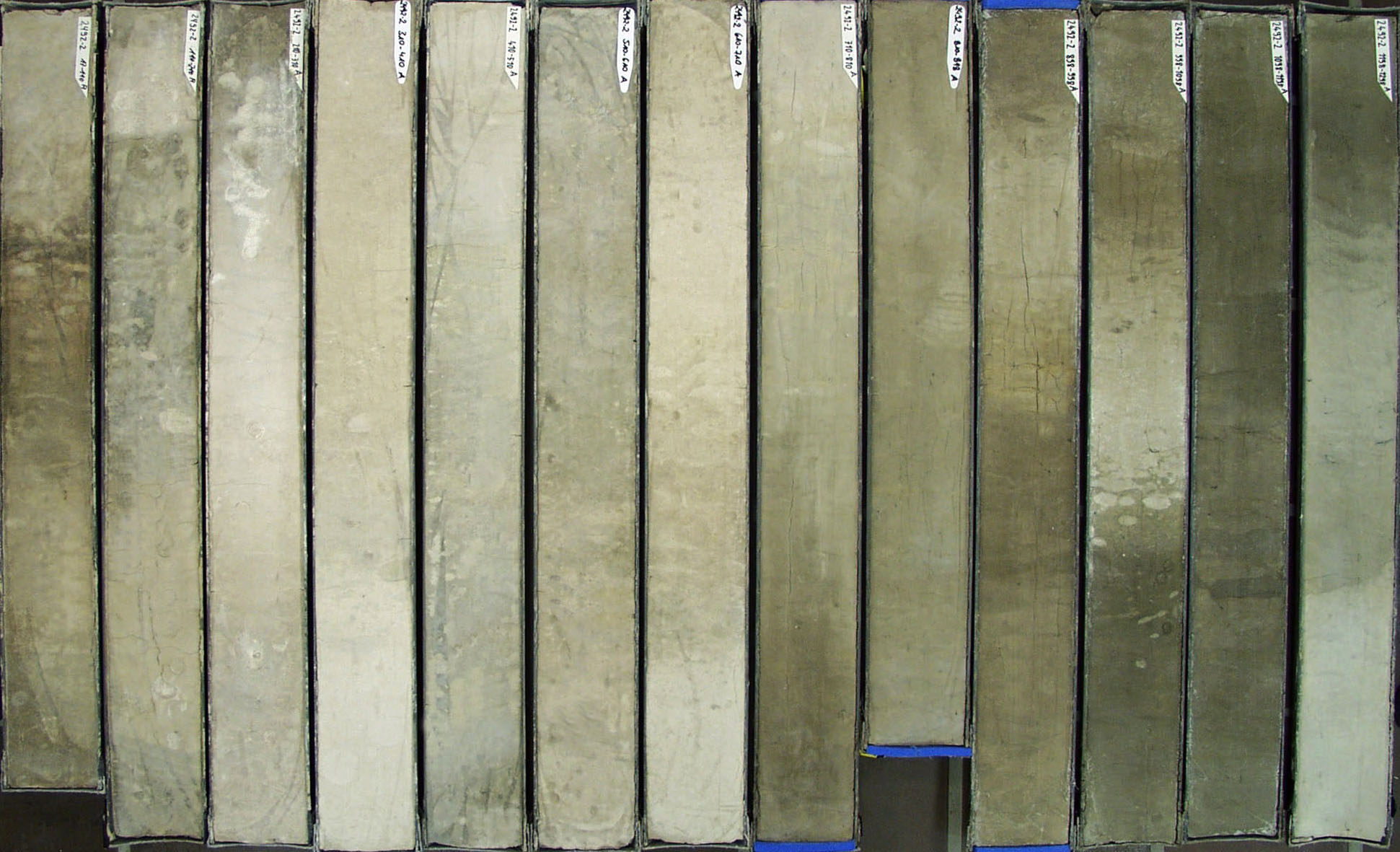
Sediment cores, like these from the South Atlantic, allow paleoceanographers to handle and study paleo-oozes

=== Before siliceous organisms ===
During the Precambrian, oceanic silica concentrations were an order of magnitude higher than in modern oceans. The evolution of biosilicification is thought to have emerged during this time period. Siliceous oozes formed once silica-sequestering organisms such as radiolarians and diatoms began to flourish in the surface waters.

=== Evolution of siliceous organisms ===
==== Radiolaria ====
Fossil evidence suggests that radiolarians first emerged during the late Cambrian as free-floating shallow-water organisms. They did not become prominent in the fossil record until the Ordovician. Radiolarites evolved in upwelling regions in areas of high primary productivity and are the oldest known organisms capable of shell secretion. The remains of radiolarians are preserved in chert; a byproduct of siliceous ooze transformation. Major speciation events of radiolarians occurred during the Mesozoic. Many of those species are now extinct in the modern ocean. Scientists hypothesize that competition with diatoms for dissolved silica during the Cenozoic is the likely cause for the mass extinction of most radiolarian species.

==== Diatoms ====
The oldest well-preserved diatom fossils have been dated to the beginning of the Jurassic period. However, the molecular record suggests diatoms evolved at least 250 million years ago during the Triassic. As new species of diatoms evolved and spread, oceanic silica levels began to decrease. Today, there are an estimated 100,000 species of diatoms, most of which are microscopic (2-200 μm). Some early diatoms were larger, and could be between 0.2 and 22mm in diameter.

The earliest diatoms were radial centrics, and lived in shallow water close to shore. These early diatoms were adapted to live on the benthos, as their outer shells were heavy and prevented them from free-floating. Free-floating diatoms, known as bipolar and multipolar centrics, began evolving approximately 100 million years ago during the Cretaceous. Fossil diatoms are preserved in diatomite (also known as diatomaceous earth), which is one of the by-products of the transformation from ooze to rock formation. As diatomaceous particles began to sink to the ocean floor, carbon and silica were sequestered along continental margins. The carbon sequestered along continental margins has become the major petroleum reserves of today. Diatom evolution marks a time in Earth's geologic history of significant removal of carbon dioxide from the atmosphere while simultaneously increasing atmospheric oxygen levels.

=== How scientists use paleo-ooze ===
Paleoceanographers study prehistoric oozes to learn about changes in the oceans over time. The sediment distribution and deposition patterns of oozes inform scientists about prehistoric areas of the oceans that exhibited prime conditions for the growth of siliceous organisms.

Scientists examine paleo-ooze by taking cores of deep sea sediments. Sediment layers in these cores reveal the deposition patterns of the ocean over time. Scientists use paleo-oozes as tools so that they can better infer the conditions of the paleo oceans. Paleo-ooze accretion rates can be used to determine deep sea circulation, tectonic activity, and climate at a specific point in time. Oozes are also useful in determining the historical abundances of siliceous organisms.

==== Burubaital Formation ====
The Burubatial Formation, located in the West Balkhash region of Kazakhstan, is the oldest known abyssal biogenic deposit. The Burubaital Formation is primarily composed of chert which was formed over a period of 15 million years (late Cambrian-middle Ordovician). It is likely that these deposits were formed in an upwelling region in subequatorial latitudes. The Burubaital Formation is largely composed of radiolarites, as diatoms had yet to evolve at the time of its formation. The Burubaital deposits have led researchers to believe that radiolaria played a significant role in the late Cambrian silica cycle. The late Cambrian (497-485.4 mya) marks a time of transition for marine biodiversity and is the beginning of ooze accumulation on the seafloor.

==== Distribution shifts during the Miocene ====
A shift in the geographical distribution of siliceous oozes occurred during the Miocene. Sixteen million years ago there was a gradual decline in siliceous ooze deposits in the North Atlantic and a concurrent rise in siliceous ooze deposits in the North Pacific. Scientists speculate that this regime shift may have been caused by the introduction of Nordic Sea Overflow Water, which contributed to the formation of North Atlantic Deep Water (NADW). The formation of Antarctic Bottom Water (AABW) occurred at approximately the same time as the formation of NADW. The formation of NADW and AABW dramatically transformed the ocean, and resulted in a spatial population shift of siliceous organisms.

==== Paleocene plankton blooms ====
The Cretaceous-Tertiary boundary was a time of global mass extinction, commonly referred to as the K-T mass extinction. While most organisms were disappearing, marine siliceous organisms were thriving in the early Paleocene seas. One such example occurred in the waters near Marlborough, New Zealand. Paleo-ooze deposits indicate that there was a rapid growth of both diatoms and radiolarians at this time. Scientists believe that this period of high biosiliceous productivity is linked to global climatic changes. This boom in siliceous plankton was greatest during the first one million years of the Tertiary period and is thought to have been fueled by enhanced upwelling in response to a cooling climate and increased nutrient cycling due to a change in sea level.

== See also ==
- Diatomaceous earth
- Calcareous ooze
