= Orthosilicic acid =

Chemical compound, Si(OH)4

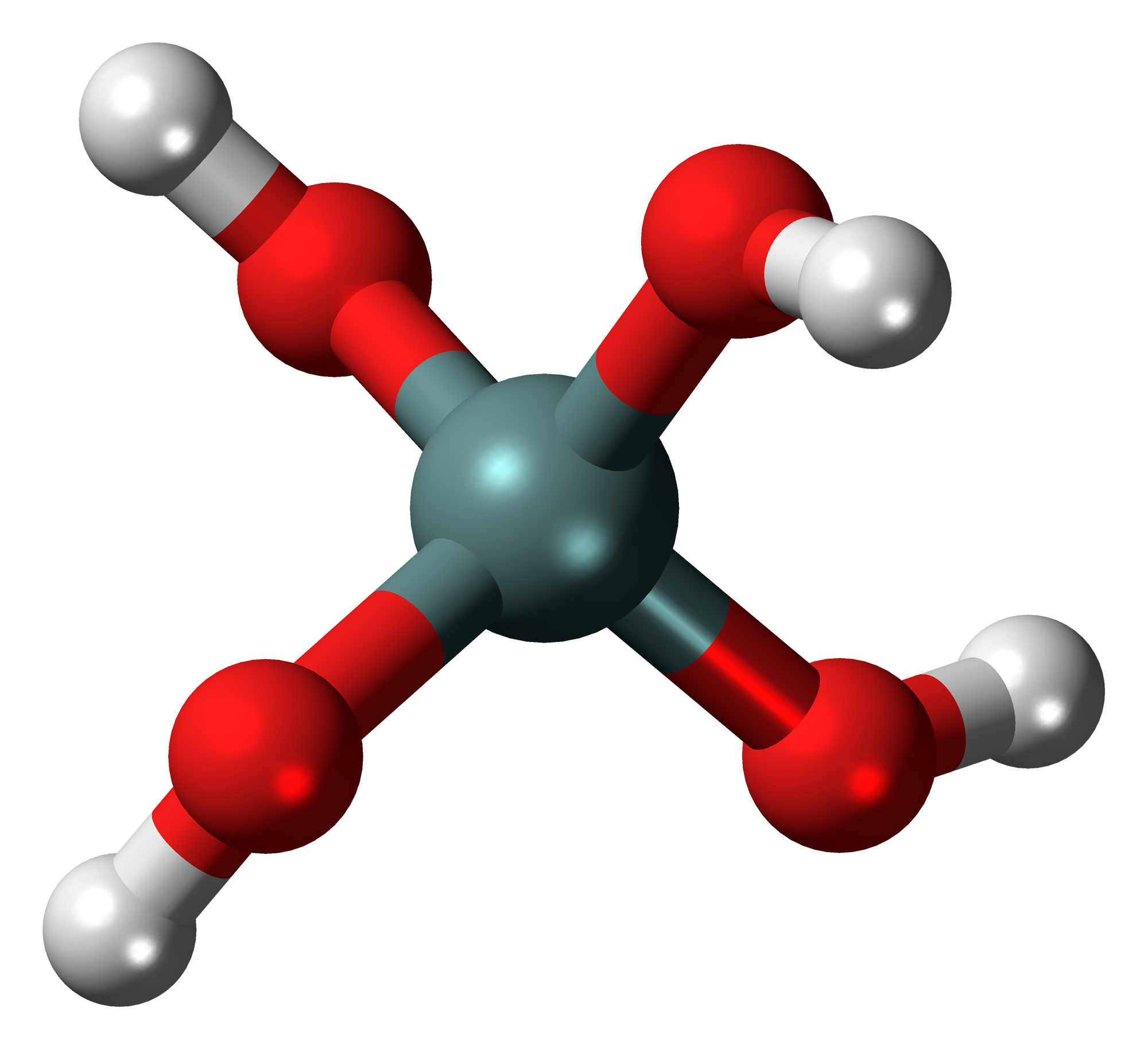
- Silicon, Si Oxygen, O Hydrogen, H

Names
- IUPAC name Silicic acid
- Other names Orthosilicic acid

Identifiers
CAS Number	10193-36-9
3D model (JSmol)	Interactive image
ChEBI	CHEBI:26675
ChemSpider	14236
ECHA InfoCard	100.030.421
EC Number	233-477-0
Gmelin Reference	2009
PubChem CID	14942
UNII	623B93YABH
CompTox Dashboard (EPA)	DTXSID5058721
- InChI: InChI=1S/H4O4Si/c1-5(2,3)4/h1-4H Key: RMAQACBXLXPBSY-UHFFFAOYSA-N; InChI=1S/H4O4Si/c1-5(2,3)4/h1-4H Key: RMAQACBXLXPBSY-UHFFFAOYSA-N; InChI=1/H4O4Si/c1-5(2,3)4/h1-4H Key: RMAQACBXLXPBSY-UHFFFAOYAS
- SMILES: O[Si](O)(O)O

Properties
Chemical formula	Si(OH)_{4}
Molar mass	96.113 g·mol^{−1}
Acidity (pK_{a})	pK_{a1} = 9.84 pK_{a2} = 13.2

Related compounds
Related compounds	Orthocarbonic acid
- Except where otherwise noted, data are given for materials in their standard state (at 25 °C [77 °F], 100 kPa). (what is ?) Infobox references

Orthosilicic acid (/ˌɔːrθəsɪˈlɪsɪk/) is an inorganic compound with the formula Si(OH)_{4}. Although rarely observed, it is the key compound of silica and silicates and the precursor to other silicic acids [H_{2x}SiO_{x+2}]_{n}. Silicic acids play important roles in biomineralization and technology. It is the parent acid of the orthosilicate anion SiO^{4−}_{4}.

== Isolation ==
Structure of Si(OH)_{4} stabilized by two chloride anions.

Typically orthosilicic acid is assumed to be a product of the hydrolysis of its esters, Si(OR)_{4}, where R stands for organyl group, as is practiced in sol-gel syntheses. These conditions are however too vigorous to allow isolation of the parent acid.

Orthosilicic acid can be produced by Pd-catalyzed hydrogenolysis of tetrabenzoxysilicon:

Si(OCH_{2}Ph)_{4} + 4 H_{2} → Si(OH)_{4} + 4 PhCH_{3}

The acid was crystallized from a solution of dimethylacetamide and tetrabutylammonium chloride. As established by X-ray crystallography, the chloride anions interact with the acid via hydrogen bonds. Otherwise, the structure consists of the expected tetrahedral silicon center.

== Reactions ==
Chemical structure of cyclo-tetrasilicic acid.

Silicic acid readily condenses to give "higher" silicic acids including disilicic (pyrosilicic) and cyclo-tetrasilicic acid, (−O−Si(OH)_{2}−)_{4}:

2 Si(OH)_{4} → O(Si(OH)_{3})_{2} + H_{2}O
4 Si(OH)_{4} → (−O−Si(OH)_{2}−)_{4} + 4 H_{2}O

These derivatives have also been characterized crystallographically.

== Orthosilicic acid in plants ==
Silicon has been explored as a nutrient for plant growth, with silica constituting up to 10% of plant weight on a dry matter basis. Orthosilicic acid is of particular interest as it is thought to be the form in which plants acquire silicon from the soil, before being deposited as phytoliths throughout the plant, leading to research in the application of orthosilicic acid through foliar sprays to supplement plant growth. Studies have demonstrated that foliar application of stabilized orthosilicic acid can alleviate abiotic stressors such as drought, heavy metal toxicity, and salinity, resulting in increased yields. Additionally, applications of orthosilicic acid have been demonstrated to reduce fungal infections and disease in plants, suggesting the possibility of using stabilized orthosilicic acid as an alternative or complement to existing disease control measures. The mechanisms by which orthosilicic acid alleviates abiotic stress and controls diseases is not well understood; current theories advanced include the activation of plant defense reactions and the precipitation of silica in the apoplast of the plant.

== Oceanic silicic acid ==
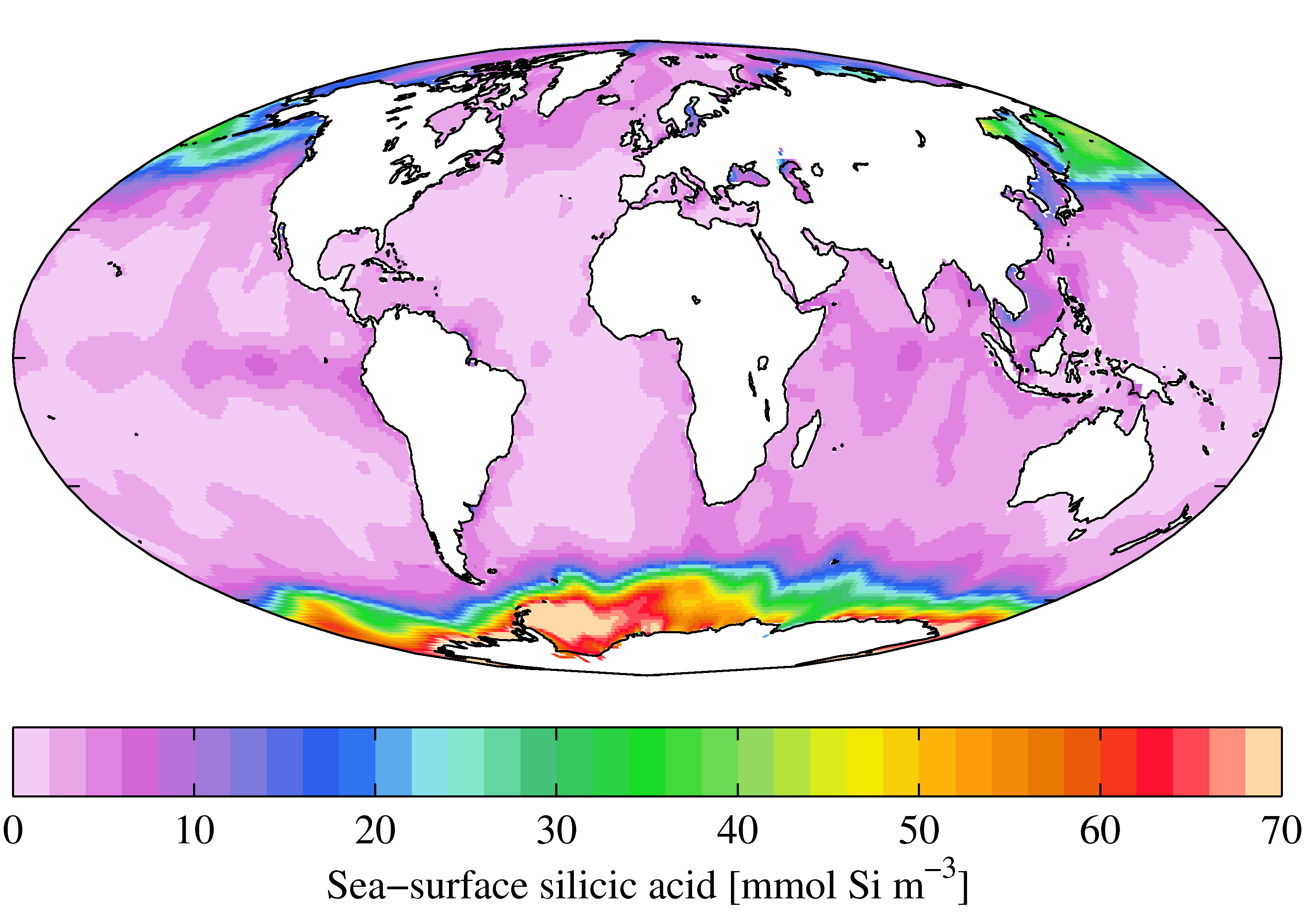
2009 silicic acid concentration in the upper pelagic zone.

Dissolved silica (DSi) is a term used in the field of oceanography to describe the form of water-soluble silica, which is assumed to be Si(OH)_{4} (orthosilicic acid) or its conjugate bases (orthosilicate anions) such as ^{−}O−Si(OH)_{3} and (^{−}O−)_{2}Si(OH)_{2}. Theoretical computations indicate that the dissolution of silica in water proceeds through the formation of a SiO_{2}·2H_{2}O complex and then orthosilicic acid. The biogeochemical cycle of silica is regulated by the algae known as the diatoms. These algae polymerise the silicic acid to so-called biogenic silica, used to construct their cell walls (called frustules).

In the uppermost water column the surface ocean is undersaturated with respect to dissolved silica, except for the Antarctic Circumpolar Current south of 55°S.

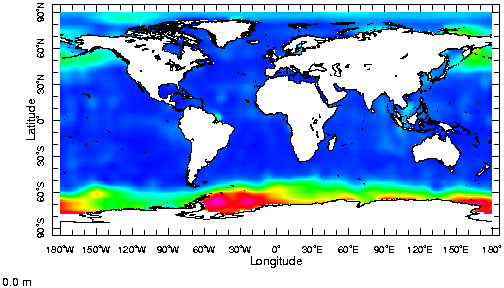

The dissolved silica concentration increases with increasing water depth, and along the conveyor belt from the Atlantic over the Indian into the Pacific Ocean.

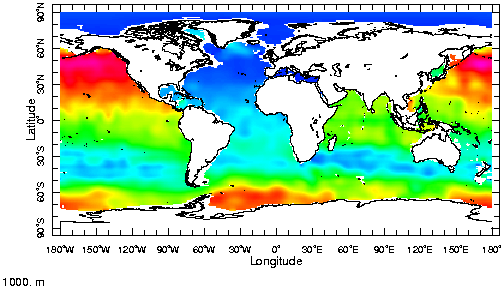
