= Authigenesis =

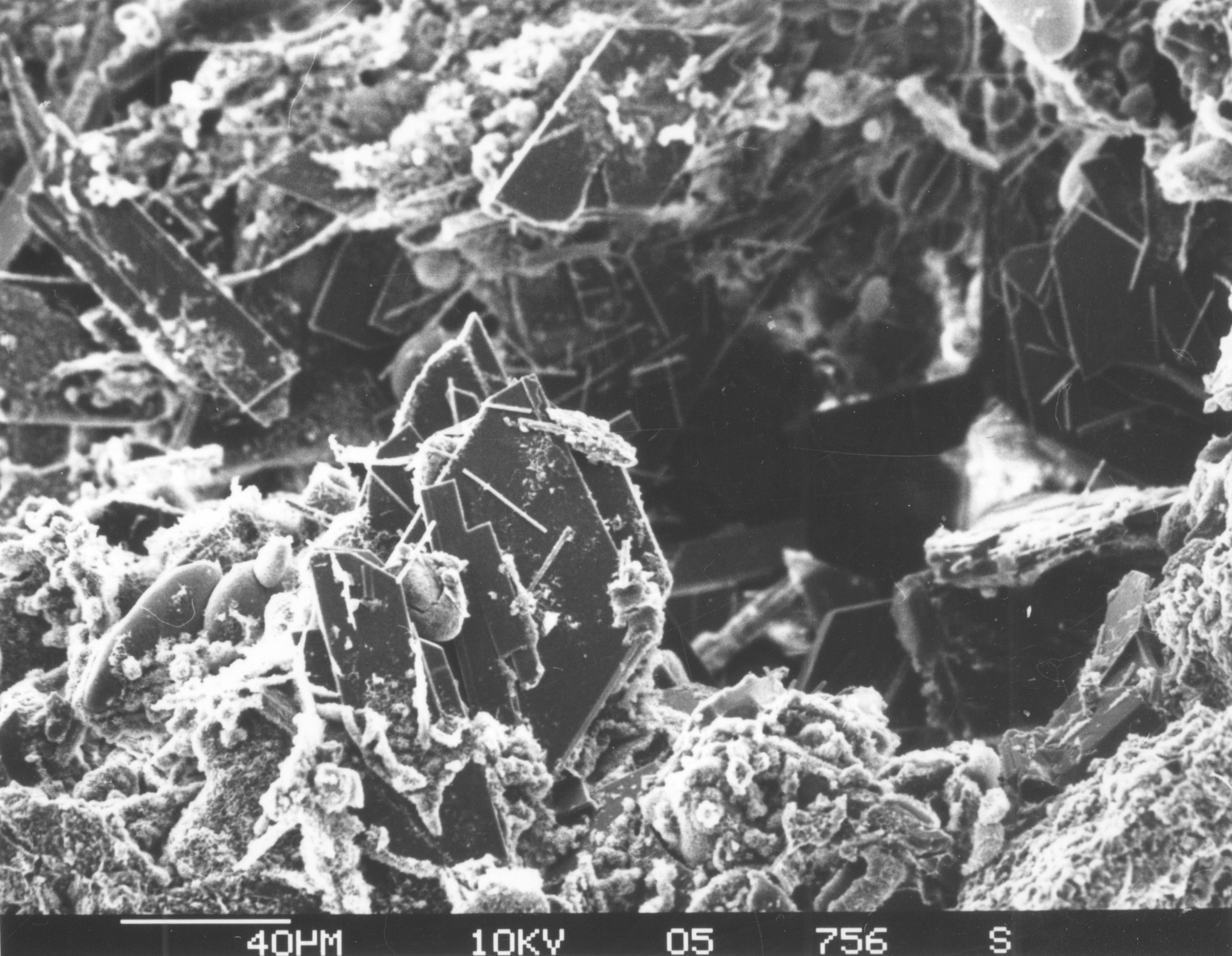
Authigenic minerals in marine sediment

Authigenesis is the process whereby a mineral or sedimentary rock deposit is generated where it is found or observed. Such deposits are described as authigenic. Authigenic sedimentary minerals form during or after sedimentation by precipitation or recrystallization as opposed to detrital minerals, which are weathered by water or wind and transported to the depositional location. Authigenic sediments are the main constituents of deep sea sedimentation, compared to shallow waters or land where detrital sediments are more common.

== Authigenesis process ==
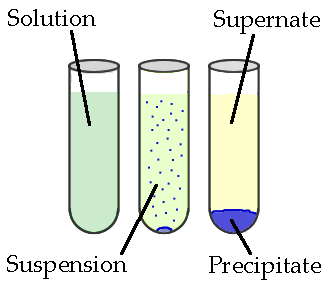
Basic steps of saturation and precipitation

The authigenesis process is driven by particles of sediment that are not in thermodynamic equilibrium with the conditions surrounding it. This often occurs in the ocean where changing conditions due to biological processes is common. In water, changing oxygen content or changing saturation causes precipitation of minerals into the sediments, changing the state of the sediments. Precipitation is the main process of authigenesis on the surface of the ocean floor, with carbonates being the primary precipitates. For any mineral to be precipitated, the water must be supersaturated with respect to that mineral. For example, the area of deposition must be above the carbonate compensation depth or the pore waters must be sufficiently saturated due to dissolution of other grains for calcite to precipitate. The high porosity of deposited sediments allow for precipitation of minerals in the porous features, as the pore water can often have different saturation than the surrounding waters, thus diminishing the porosity and creating authigenic minerals.

Over time, sediments become more buried by deposition and precipitation. This causes compaction and cementation to occur and decreases porosity farther, changing the control on the authigenesis process from fluid composition to temperature. Increased temperatures around sediments leads to increased reactions in order for the sediment to reach thermodynamic equilibrium with the surroundings. This often is done through dehydration reactions because these reactions have a high entropy release.

== Metamorphism ==
At larger depths, the line between authigenesis and metamorphism is blurred. In metamorphic petrology an authigenic mineral is one formed in situ during metamorphism, again by precipitation from fluids or recrystallization. However, minerals created by temperatures above 250 degrees Celsius are generally agreed upon to not be authigenic minerals, but rather metamorphic minerals.

== Common authigenic minerals in sedimentary rocks ==
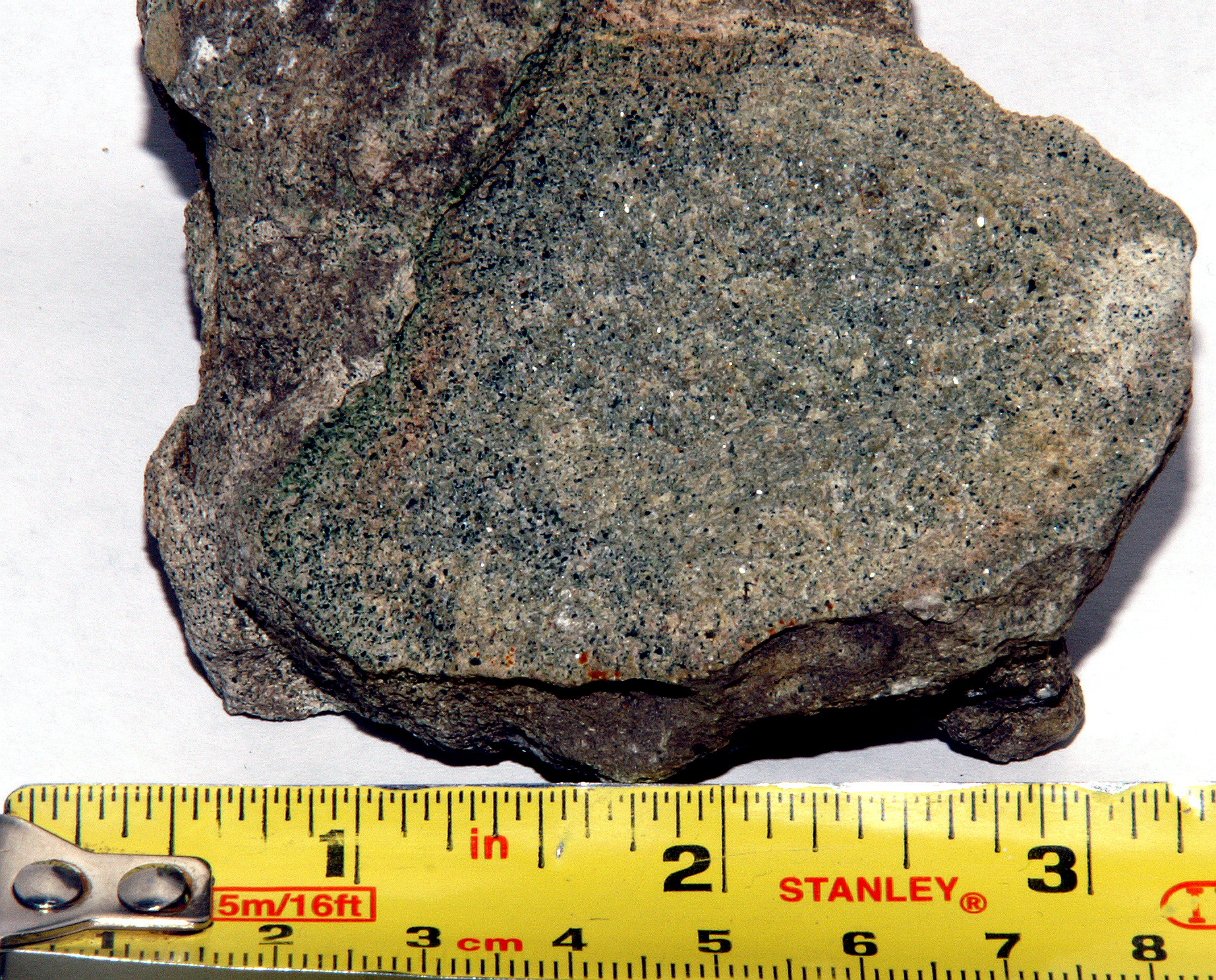
Authigenic glauconite from Dorset, England

- calcium carbonate
- apatite
- clays
- hematite
- limonite
- chamosite
- siderite
- silica
- glauconite
- pyrite

== See also ==
- Neomorphism
