= Protist shell =

Protective shell of a type of eukaryotic organism

Coccolithophore shells

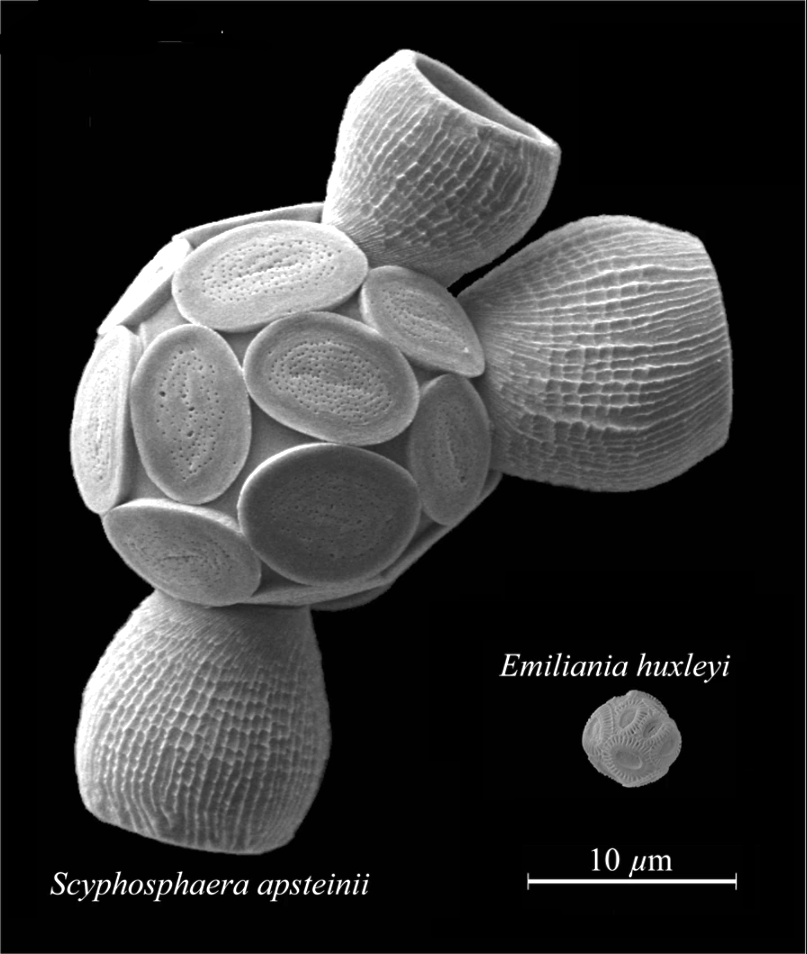
Size comparison between the relatively large coccolithophore Scyphosphaera apsteinii and the relatively small but ubiquitous coccolithophore Emiliania huxleyi

Many protists have protective shells or tests, usually made from silica (glass) or calcium carbonate (chalk). Protists are a diverse group of eukaryote organisms that are not plants, animals, or fungi. They are typically microscopic unicellular organisms that live in water or moist environments.

Protists shells are often tough, mineralised forms that resist degradation, and can survive the death of the protist as a microfossil. Although protists are typically very small, they are ubiquitous. Their numbers are such that their shells play a huge part in the formation of ocean sediments and in the global cycling of elements and nutrients.

The role of protist shells depends on the type of protist. Protists such as diatoms and radiolaria have intricate, glass-like shells made of silica that are hard and protective, and serve as a barrier to prevent water loss. The shells have small pores that allow for gas exchange and nutrient uptake. Coccolithophores and foraminifera also have hard protective shells, but the shells are made of calcium carbonate. These shells can help with buoyancy, allowing the organisms to float in the water column and move around more easily.

In addition to protection and support, protist shells also serve scientists as a means of identification. By examining the characteristics of the shells, different species of protists can be identified and their ecology and evolution can be studied.

== Protists ==
Cellular life likely originated as single-celled prokaryotes (including modern bacteria and archaea) and later evolved into more complex eukaryotes. Eukaryotes include organisms such as plants, animals, fungi and "protists". Protists are usually single-celled and microscopic. They can be heterotrophic, meaning they obtain nutrients by consuming other organisms, or autotrophic, meaning they produce their own food through photosynthesis or chemosynthesis, or mixotrophic, meaning they produce their own food through a mixture of those methods.

The term protist came into use historically to refer to a group of biologically similar organisms; however, modern research has shown it to be a paraphyletic group that does not contain all descendants of a common ancestor. As such it does not constitute a clade and is not currently in formal scientific use. Nonetheless, the term continues to be used informally to refer to those eukaryotes that cannot be classified as plants, fungi or animals.

Most protists are too small to be seen with the naked eye. They are highly diverse organisms currently organised into 18 phyla, but are not easy to classify. Studies have shown high protist diversity exists in oceans, deep sea-vents and river sediments, suggesting large numbers of eukaryotic microbial communities have yet to be discovered. As eukaryotes, protists possess within their cell at least one nucleus, as well as organelles such as mitochondria and Golgi bodies. Many protists are asexual but can reproduce rapidly through mitosis or by fragmentation; others (including foraminifera) may reproduce either sexually or asexually.

In contrast to the cells of bacteria and archaea, the cells of protists and other eukaryotes are highly organised. Plants, animals and fungi are usually multi-celled and are typically macroscopic. Most protists are single-celled and microscopic, but there are exceptions, and some marine protists are neither single-celled nor microscopic, such as seaweed.

== Silicon-based shells ==
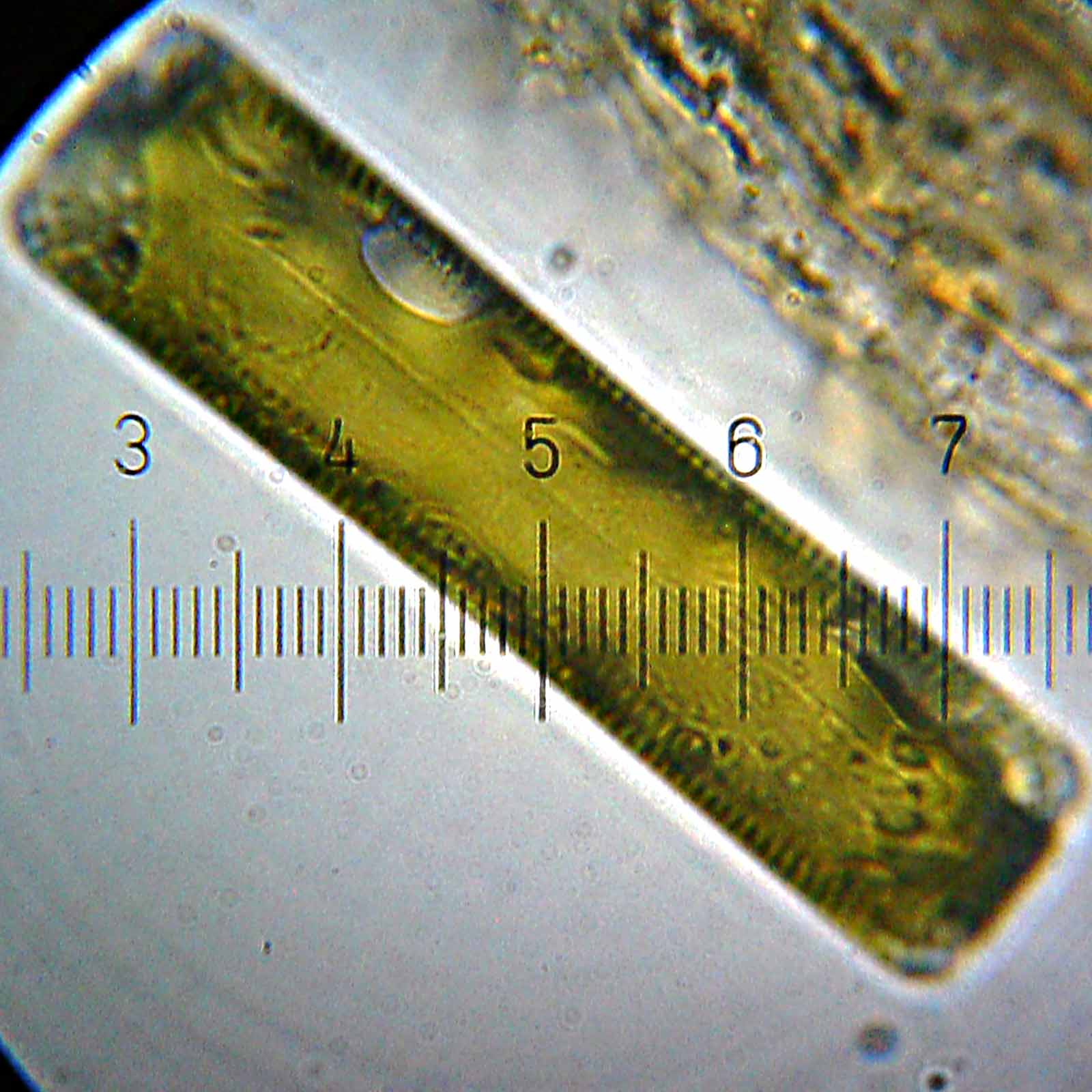
A diatom, enclosed in a silica cell wall

Although silicon is readily available in the form of silicates, very few organisms use it directly. Diatoms, radiolaria, and siliceous sponges use biogenic silica as a structural material for their skeletons. In more advanced plants, the silica phytoliths (opal phytoliths) are rigid microscopic bodies occurring in the cell; some plants, including rice, need silica for their growth. Silica has been shown to improve plant cell wall strength and structural integrity in some plants.

=== Diatoms ===
Diatoms form a (disputed) phylum containing about 100,000 recognised species of mainly unicellular algae. Diatoms generate about 20 per cent of the oxygen produced on the planet each year, take in over 6.7 billion metric tons of silicon each year from the waters in which they live, and contribute nearly half of the organic material found in the oceans.

Diatoms are enclosed in protective silica (glass) shells called frustules. The intricate structure of many of these frustules is such that they are often referred to as "jewels of the sea". Each frustule is made from two interlocking parts covered with tiny holes through which the diatom exchanges nutrients and wastes. The frustules of dead diatoms drift to the ocean floor where, over millions of years, they can build up as much as half a mile deep.

Diatoms uses silicon in the biogenic silica (BSiO_{2}) form, which is taken up by the silicon transport protein to be predominantly used in constructing these protective cell wall structures. Silicon enters the ocean in a dissolved form such as silicic acid or silicate. Since diatoms are one of the main users of these forms of silicon, they contribute greatly to the concentration of silicon throughout the ocean. Silicon forms a nutrient-like profile in the ocean due to the diatom productivity in shallow depths, which means there is less concentration of silicon in the upper ocean and more concentration of silicon in the deep ocean.

Diatom productivity in the upper ocean contribute to the amount of silicon exported to the lower ocean. When diatom cells are lysed in the upper ocean, their nutrients like, iron, zinc, and silicon, are brought to the lower ocean through a process called marine snow. Marine snow involves the downward transfer of particulate organic matter by vertical mixing of dissolved organic matter. Availability of silicon appears crucial for diatom productivity, and as long as silicic acid is available for diatoms to utilize, the diatoms contribute other important nutrient concentrations in the deep ocean.

In coastal zones, diatoms serve as the major phytoplanktonic organisms and greatly contribute to biogenic silica production. In the open ocean, however, diatoms have a reduced role in global annual silica production. Diatoms in North Atlantic and North Pacific subtropical gyres contribute only about 6% of global annual marine silica production, while the Southern Ocean produces about one-third of the global marine biogenic silica. The Southern Ocean is referred to as having a "biogeochemical divide", since only minuscule amounts of silicon is transported out of this region.

Diatom shapes
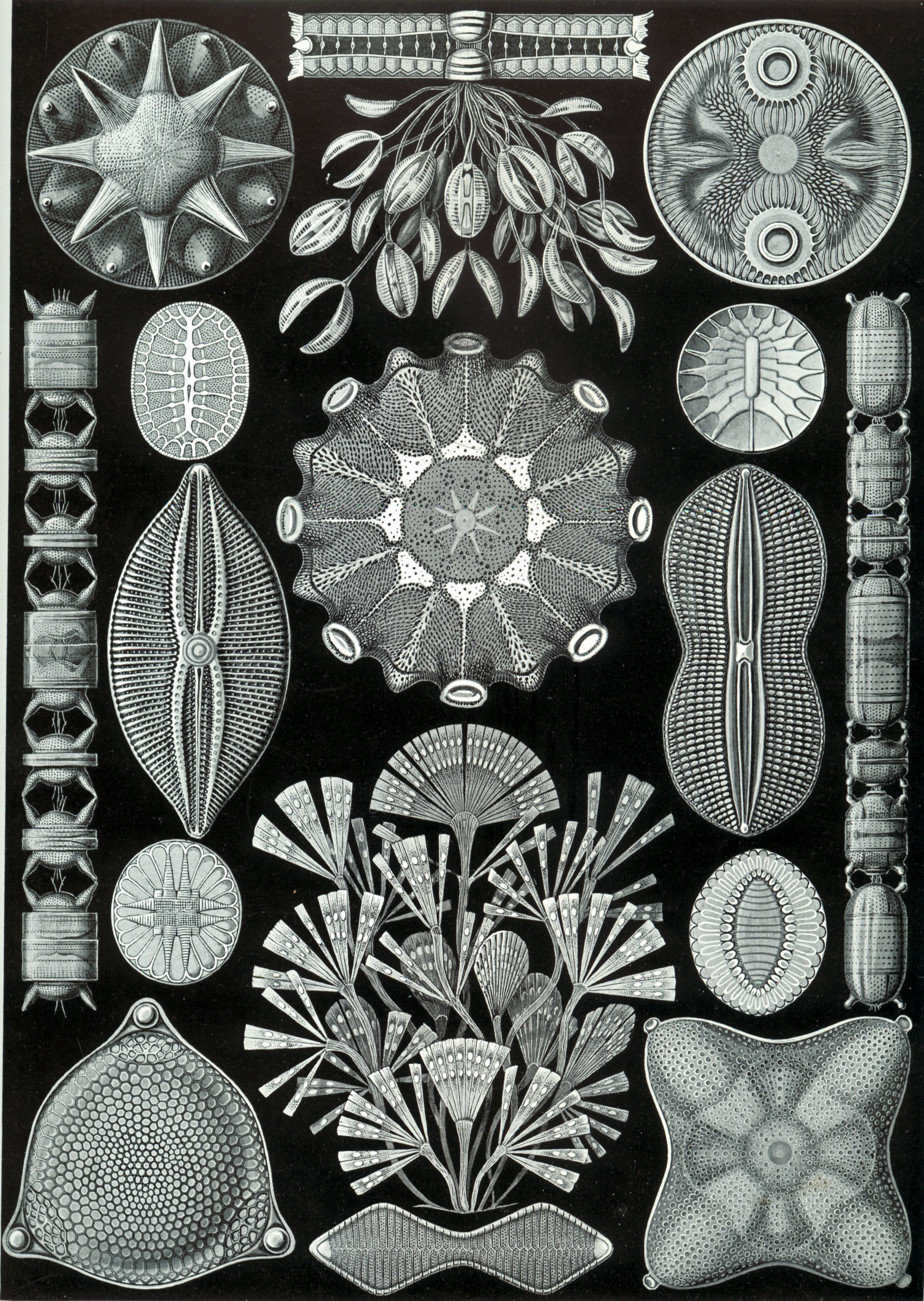
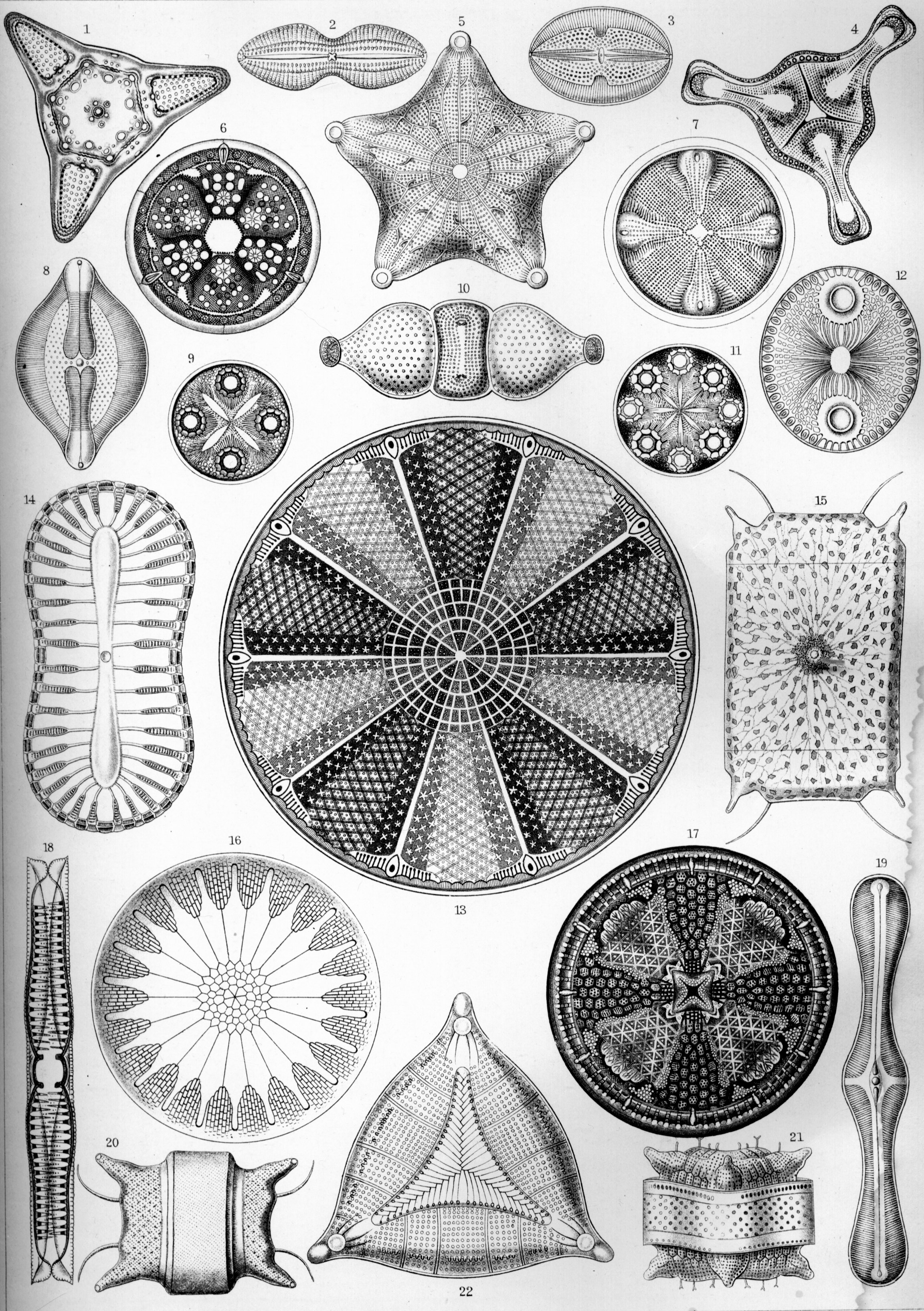
Drawings by Haeckel 1904
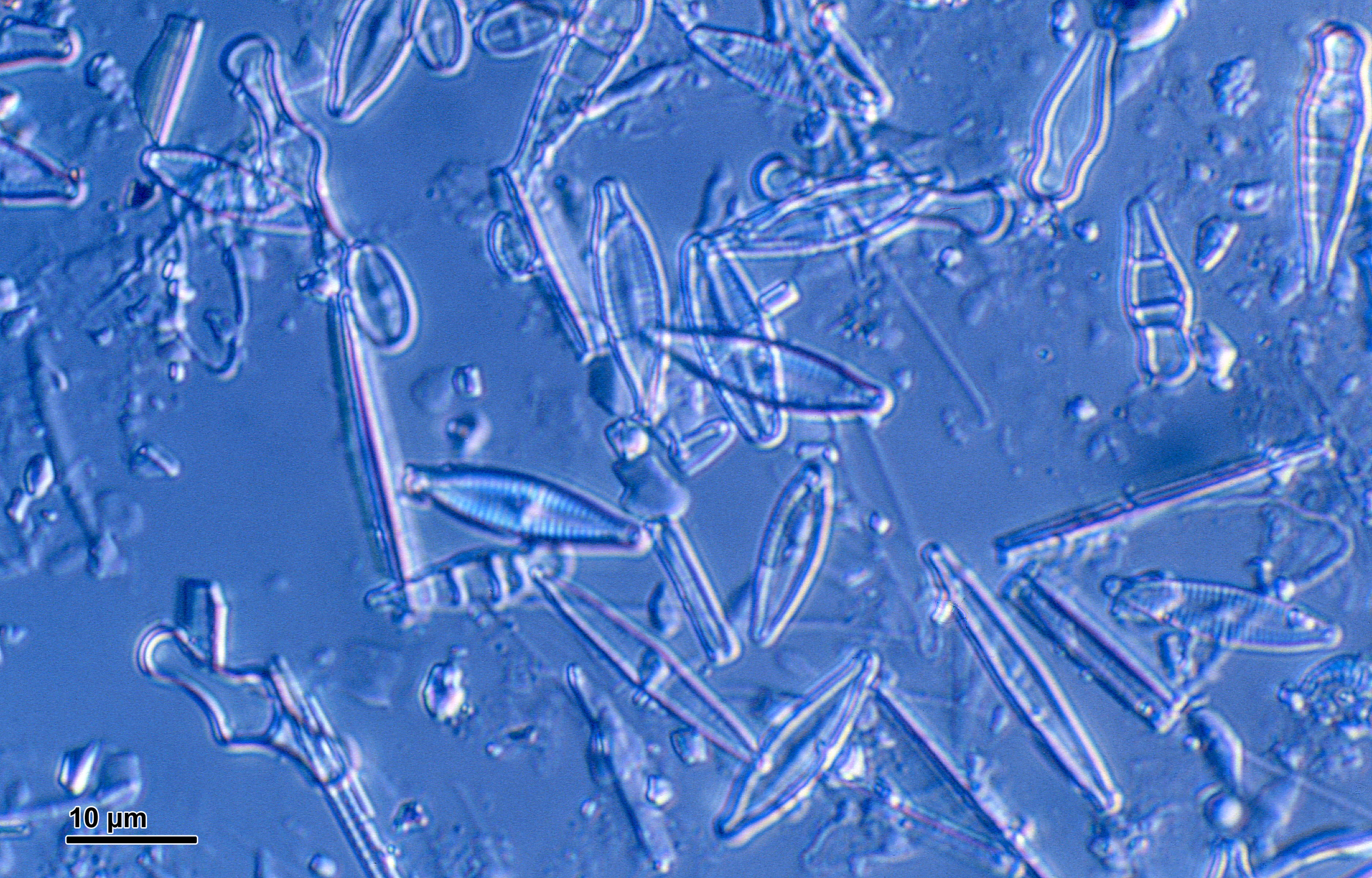
Diatoms are one of the most common types of phytoplankton

Their protective shells (frustles) are made of silicon

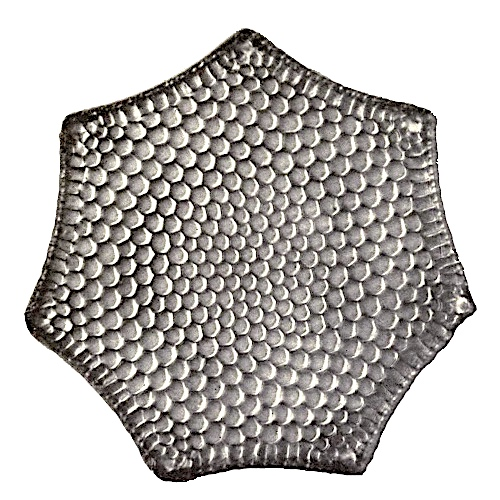

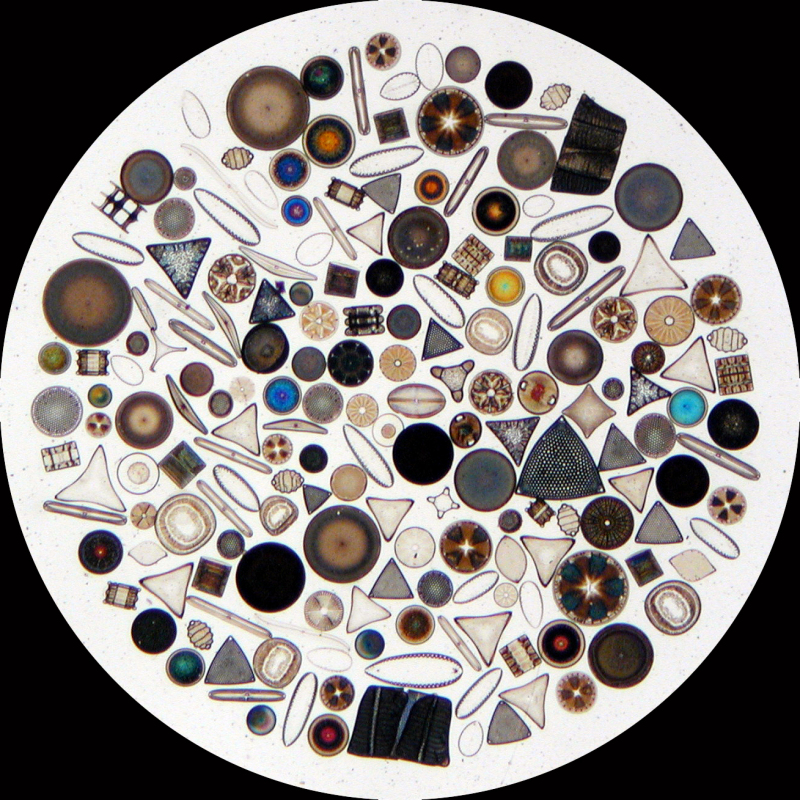
They come in many shapes and sizes
Diatoms

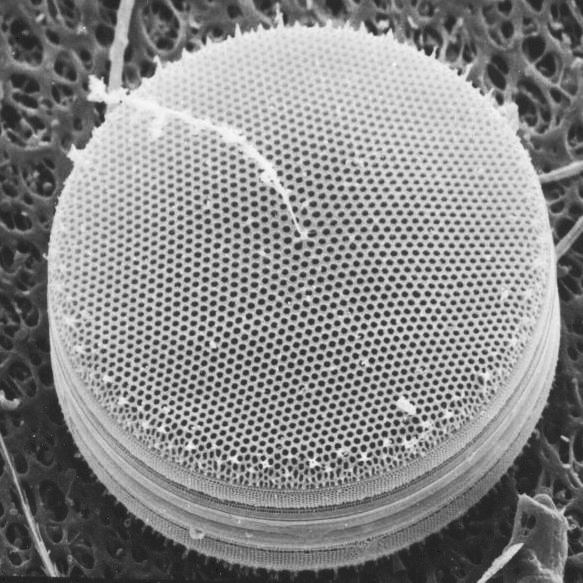
Centric

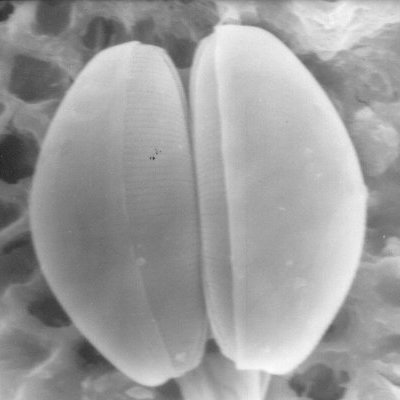
Pennate

Diatoms have a silica shell (frustule) with radial (centric) or bilateral (pennate) symmetry
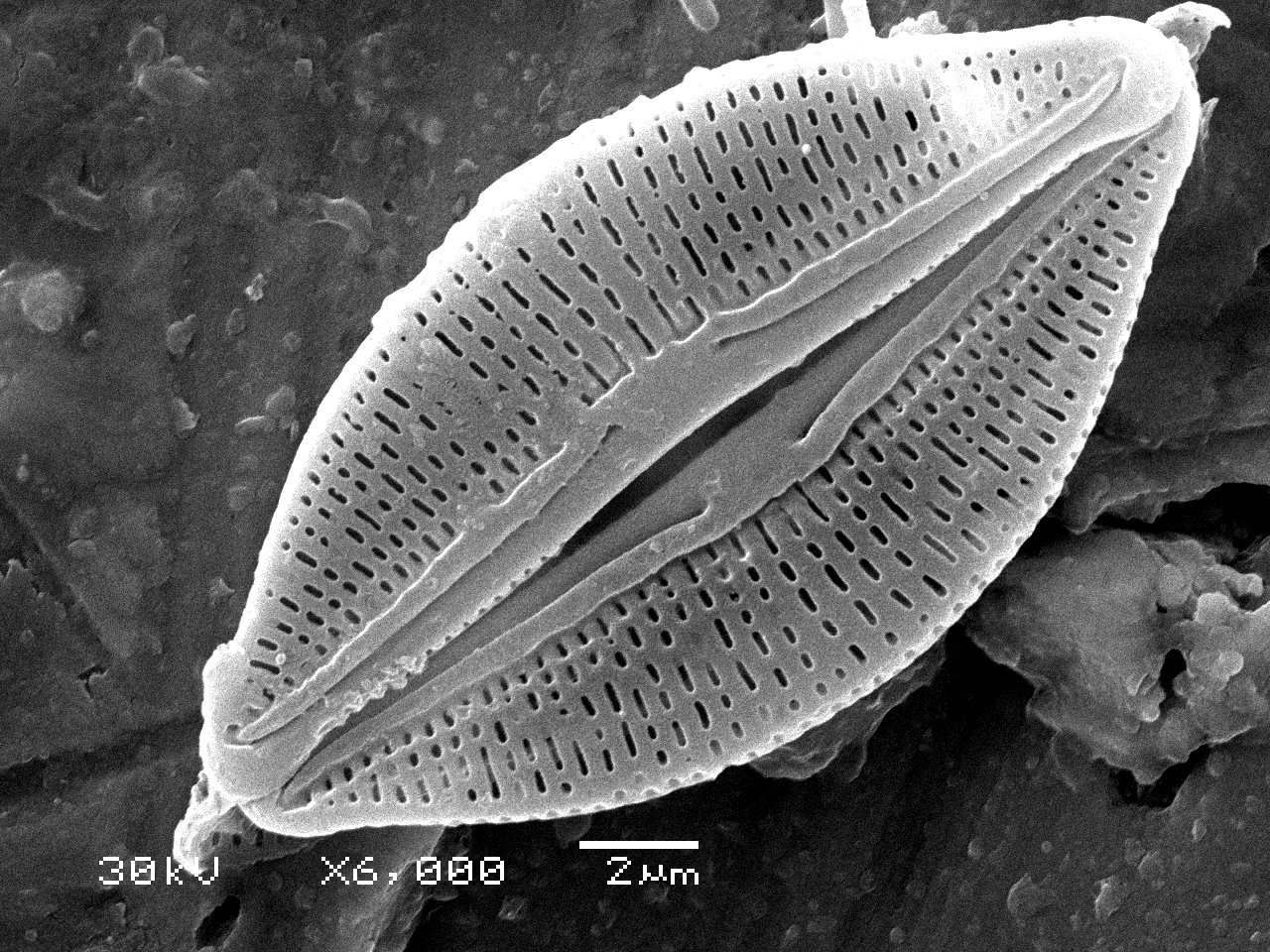
Silicified frustule of a pennate diatom with two overlapping halves

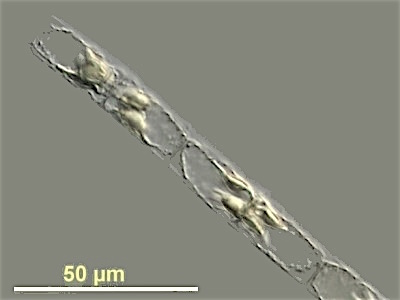
Guinardia delicatula, a diatom responsible for algal blooms in the North Sea and the English Channel

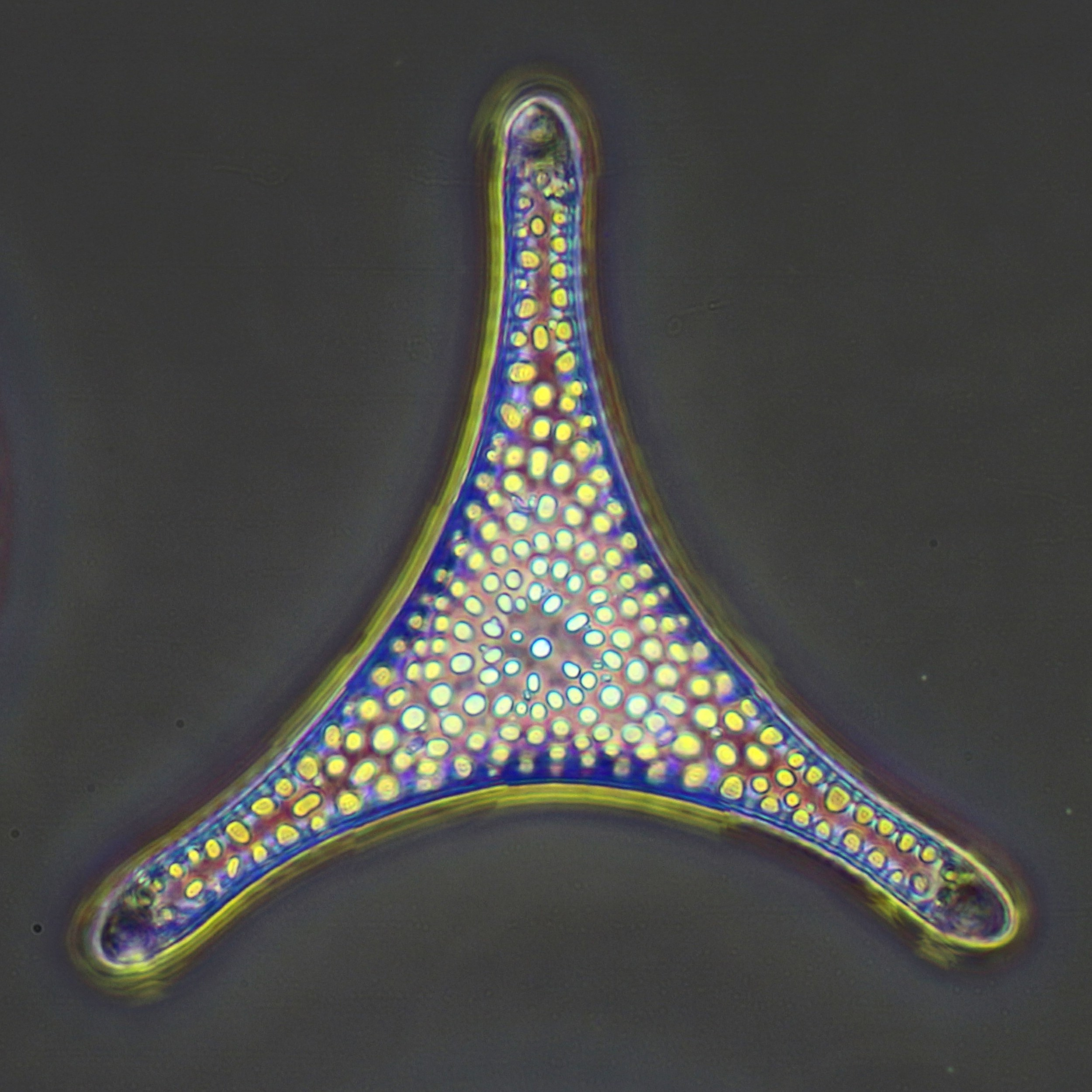
Fossil diatom

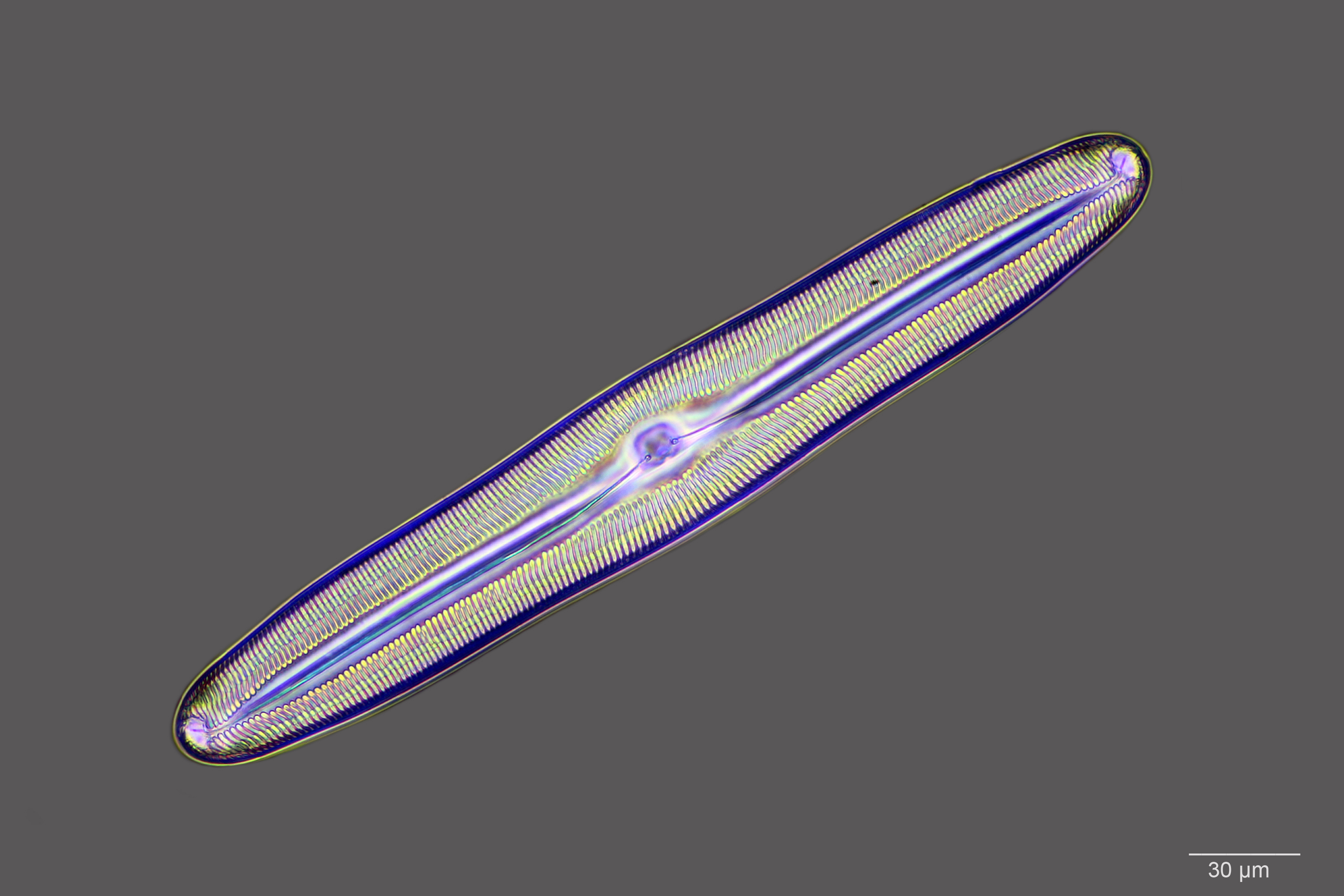
There are over 100,000 species of diatoms which account for 50% of the ocean's primary production

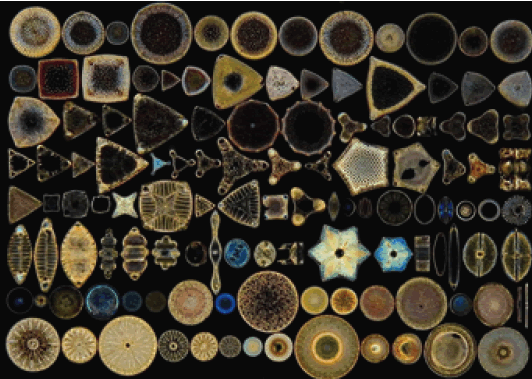
Different diatom frustule shapes and sizes

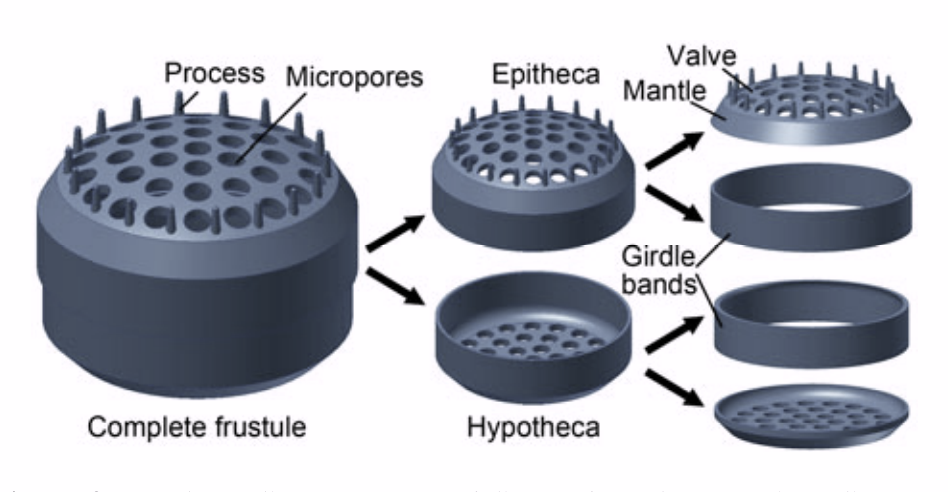
Structure of a centric diatom frustule

Diatoms

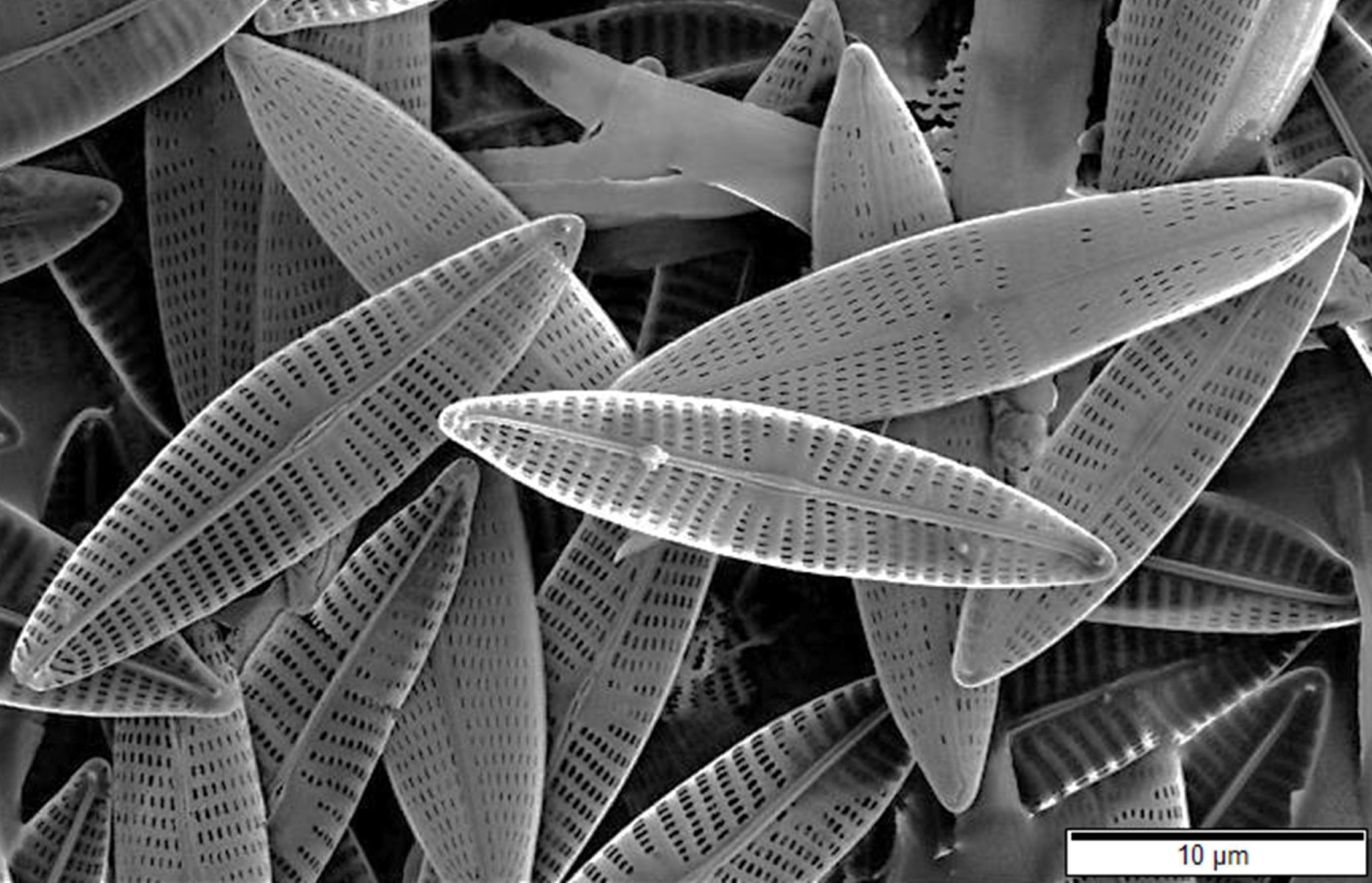
Diatoms, major components of marine plankton, have silica skeletons called frustules. "The microscopic structures of diatoms help them manipulate light, leading to hopes they could be used in new technologies for light detection, computing or robotics.

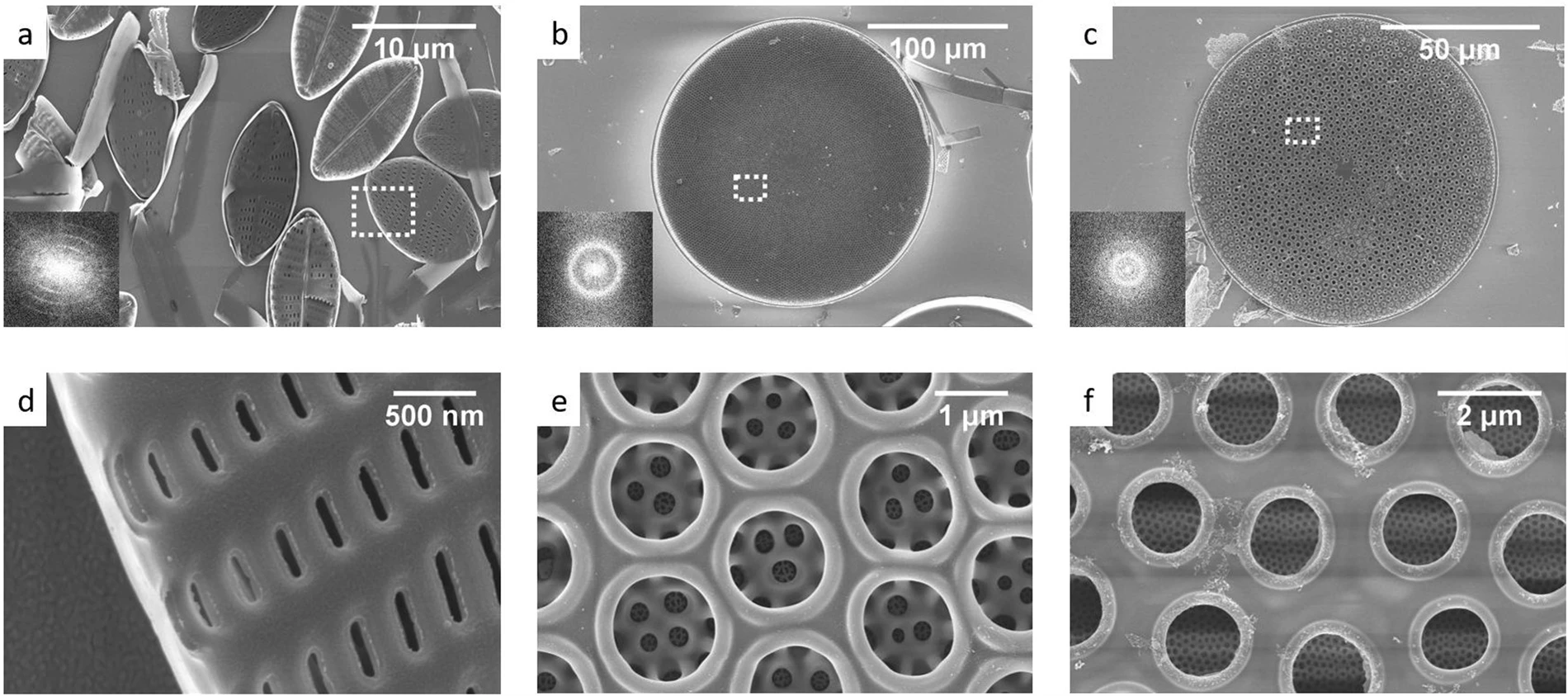
SEM images of pores in diatom frustules

Diatom frustules have been accumulating for over 100 million years, leaving rich deposits of nano and microstructured silicon oxide in the form of diatomaceous earth around the globe. The evolutionary causes for the generation of nano and microstructured silica by photosynthetic algae are not yet clear. However, in 2018 it was shown that absorption of ultraviolet light by nanostructured silica protects the DNA in the algal cells, and this may be an evolutionary cause for the formation of the glass cages.

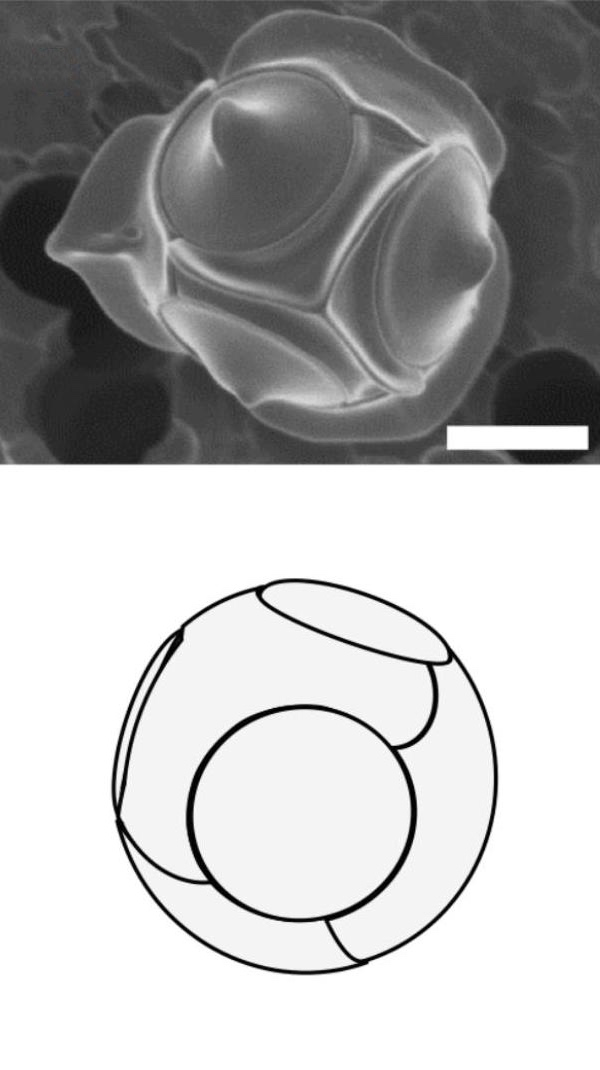
Triparma laevis and a drawing of its silicate shell, scale bar = 1 μm.

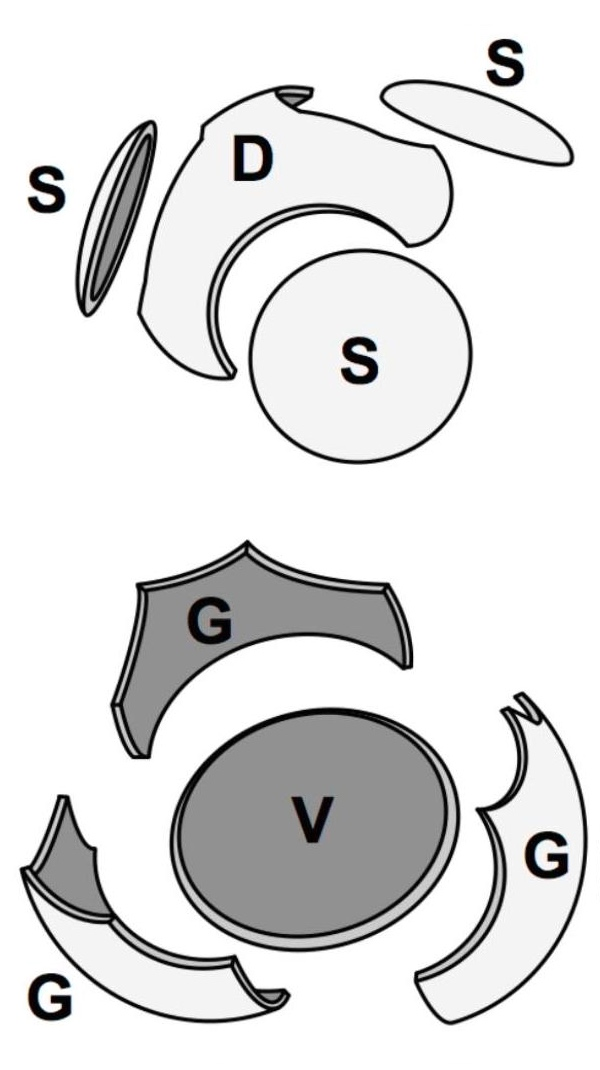
Exploded drawing of the shell, D = dorsal plate, G = girdle plate, S = shield plate and V = ventral plate.

Triparma laevis belongs to the Bolidophyceae, a sister taxon to the diatoms.

External videos
- Diatoms: Tiny factories you can see from space
- How diatoms build their beautiful shells – Journey to the Microcosmos

=== Radiolarians ===
Radiolarian shapes
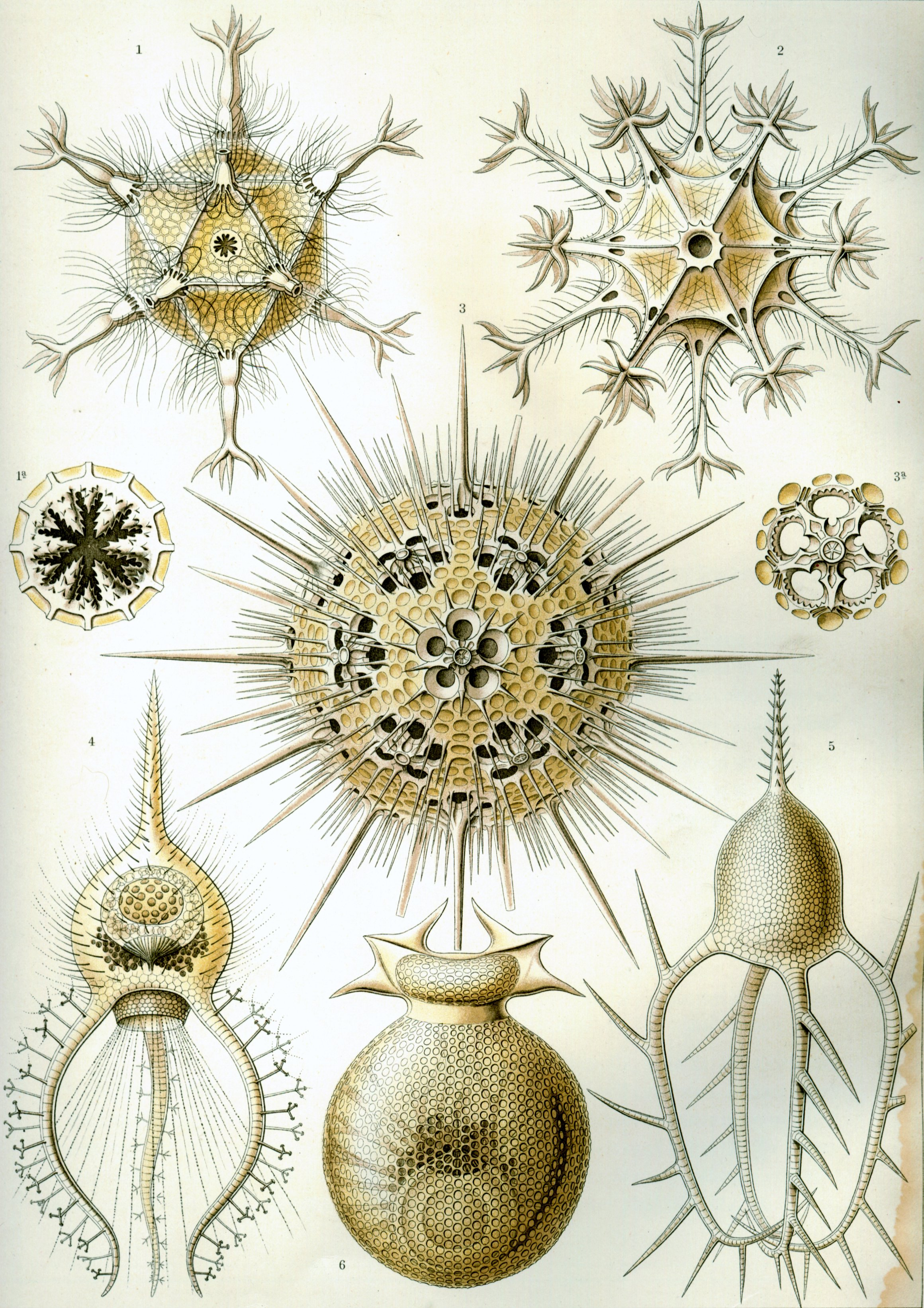
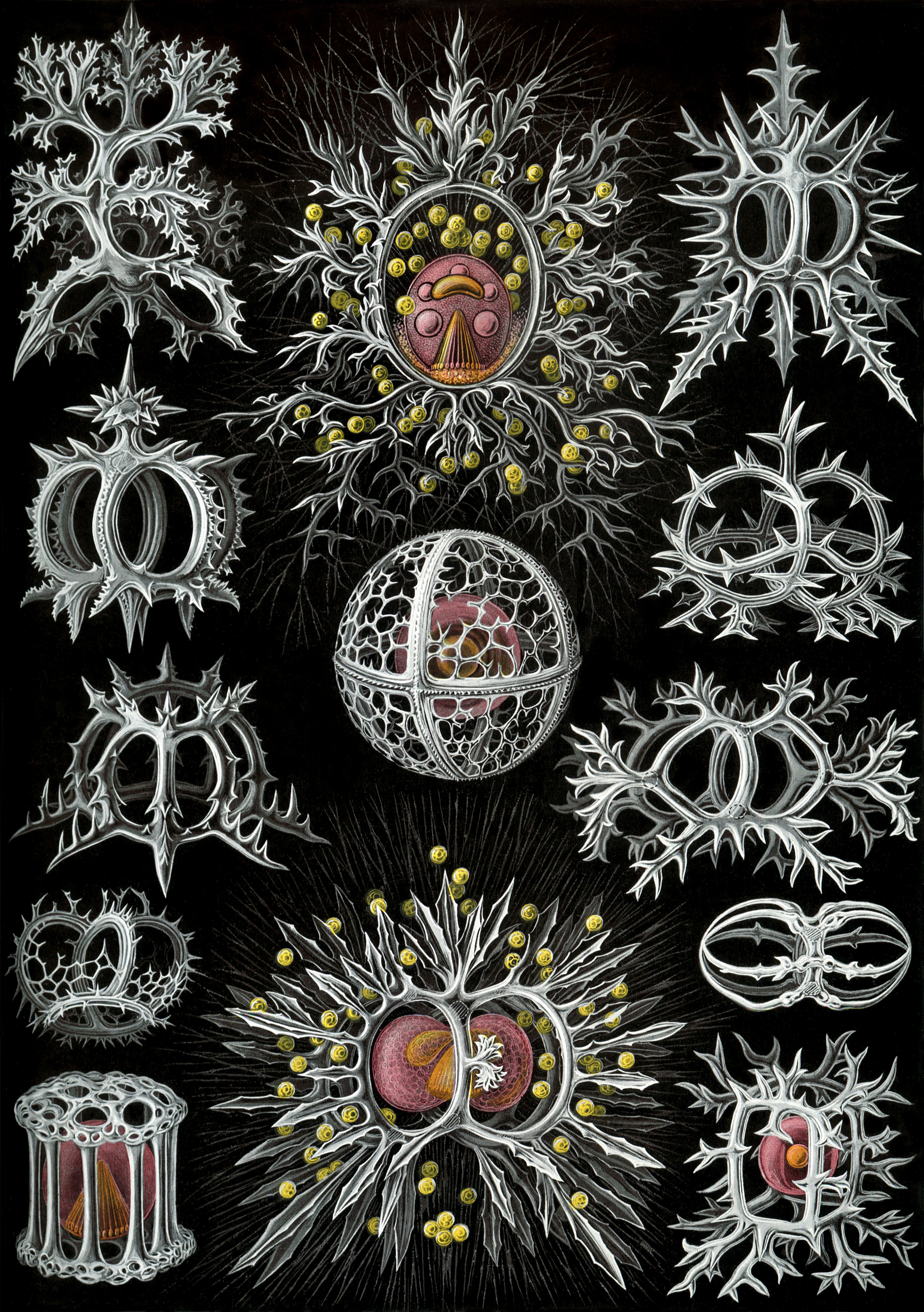
Drawings by Haeckel 1904

Radiolarians are unicellular predatory protists encased in elaborate globular shells (or "capsules"), usually made of silica and pierced with holes. Their name comes from the Latin for "radius". They catch prey by extending parts of their body through the holes. As with the silica frustules of diatoms, radiolarian shells can sink to the ocean floor when radiolarians die and become preserved as part of the ocean sediment. These remains, as microfossils, provide valuable information about past oceanic conditions.

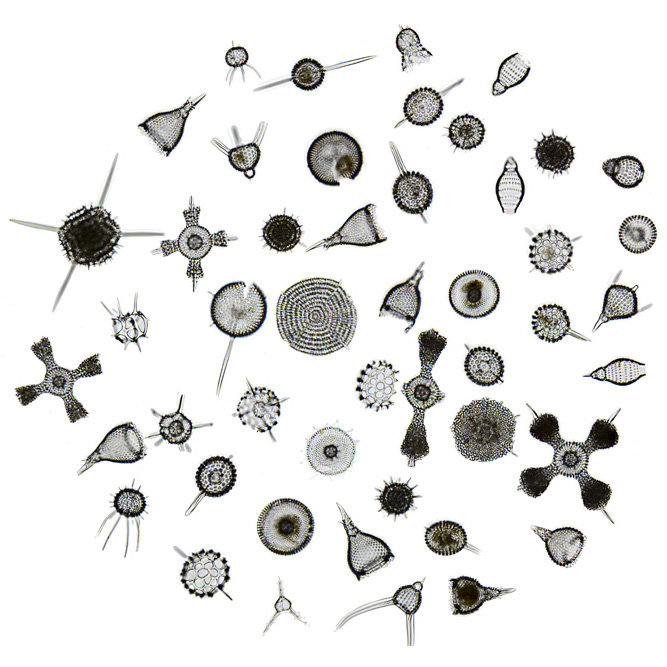
Like diatoms, radiolarians come in many shapes

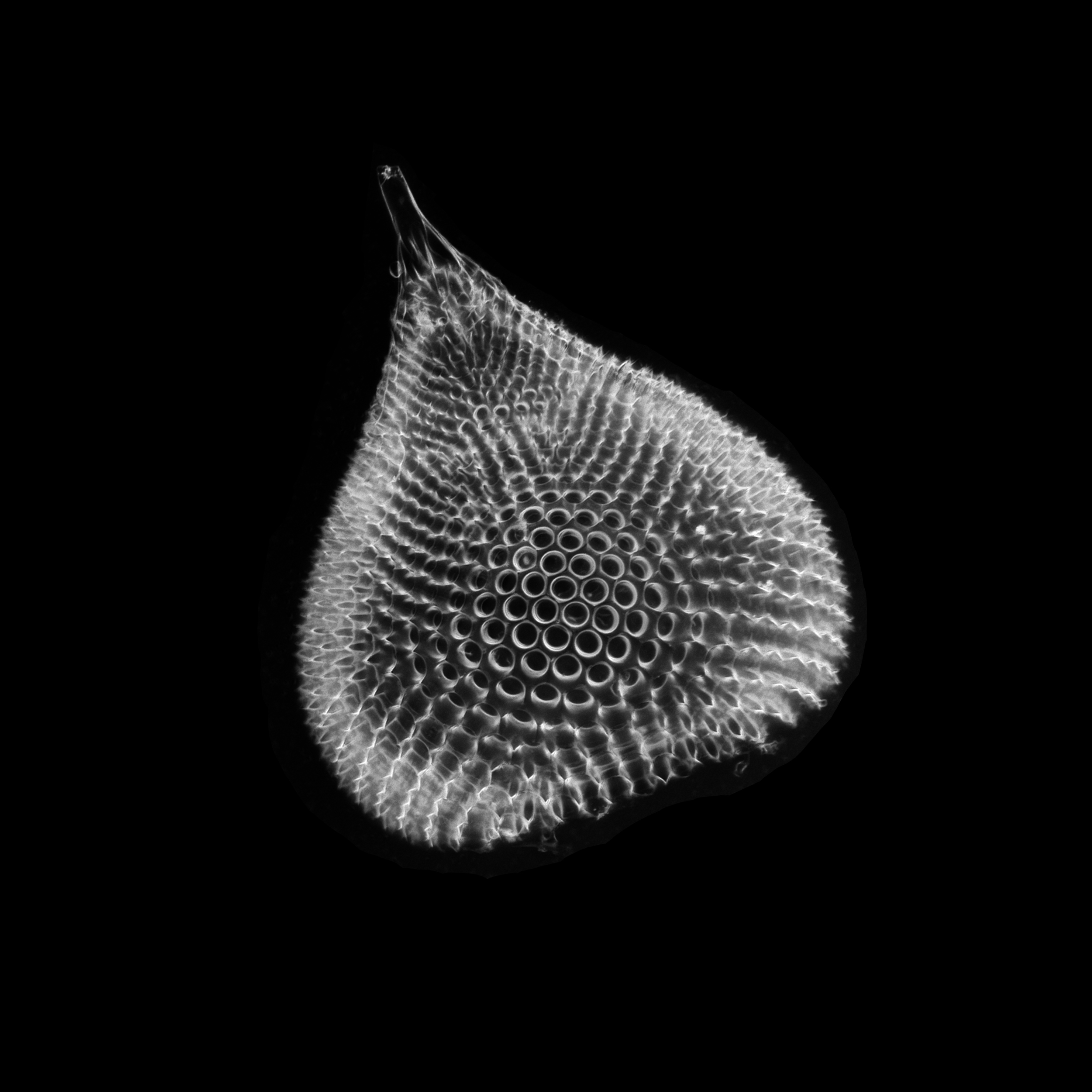
Also like diatoms, radiolarian shells are usually made of silicate

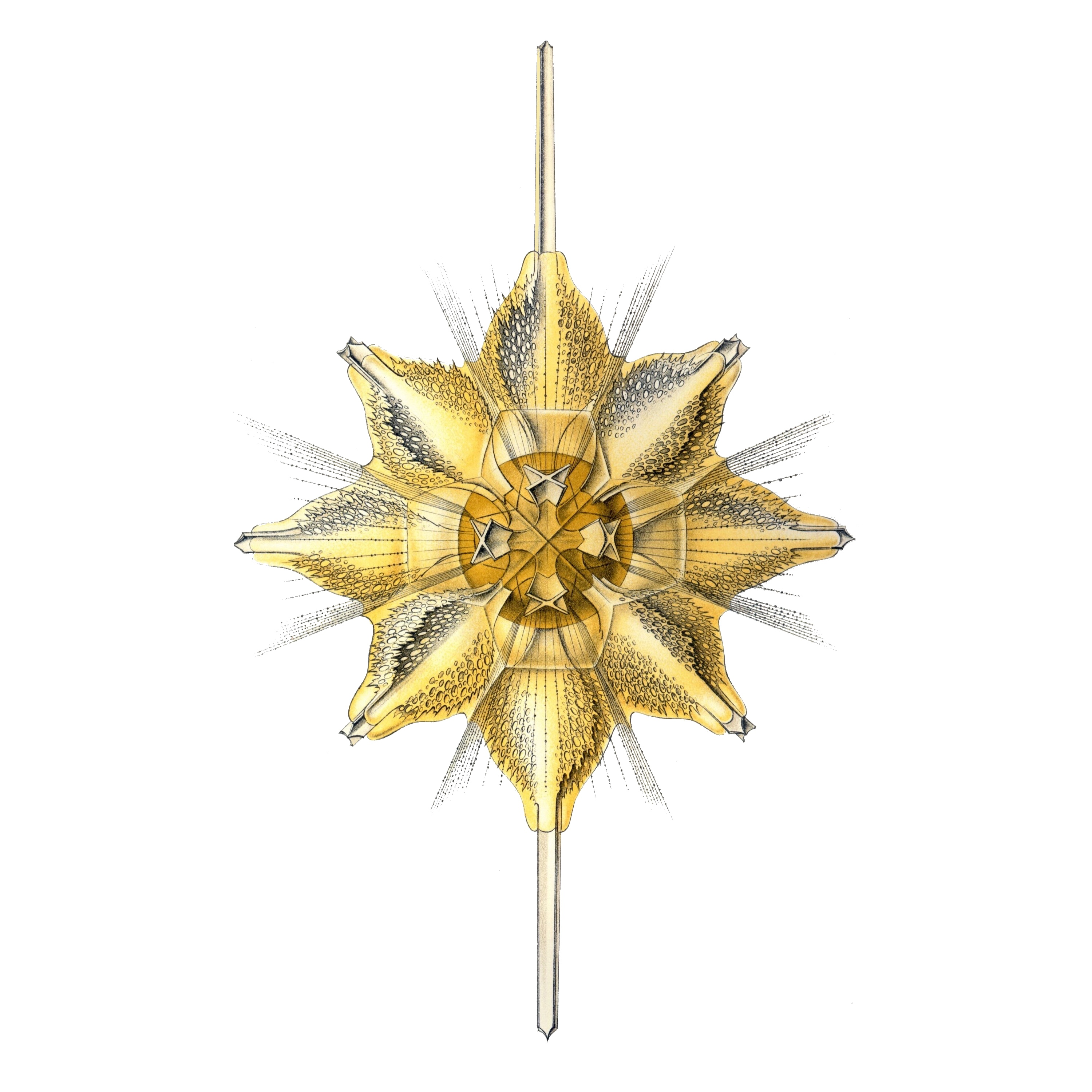
However acantharian radiolarians have shells made from strontium sulfate crystals

An animation of the diversity of radiolarian shells

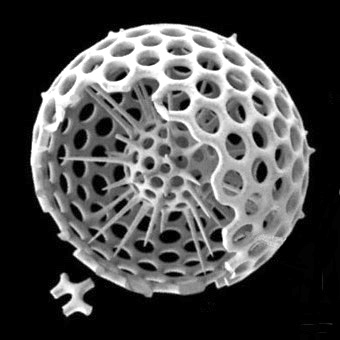
Cutaway schematic diagram of a spherical radiolarian shell

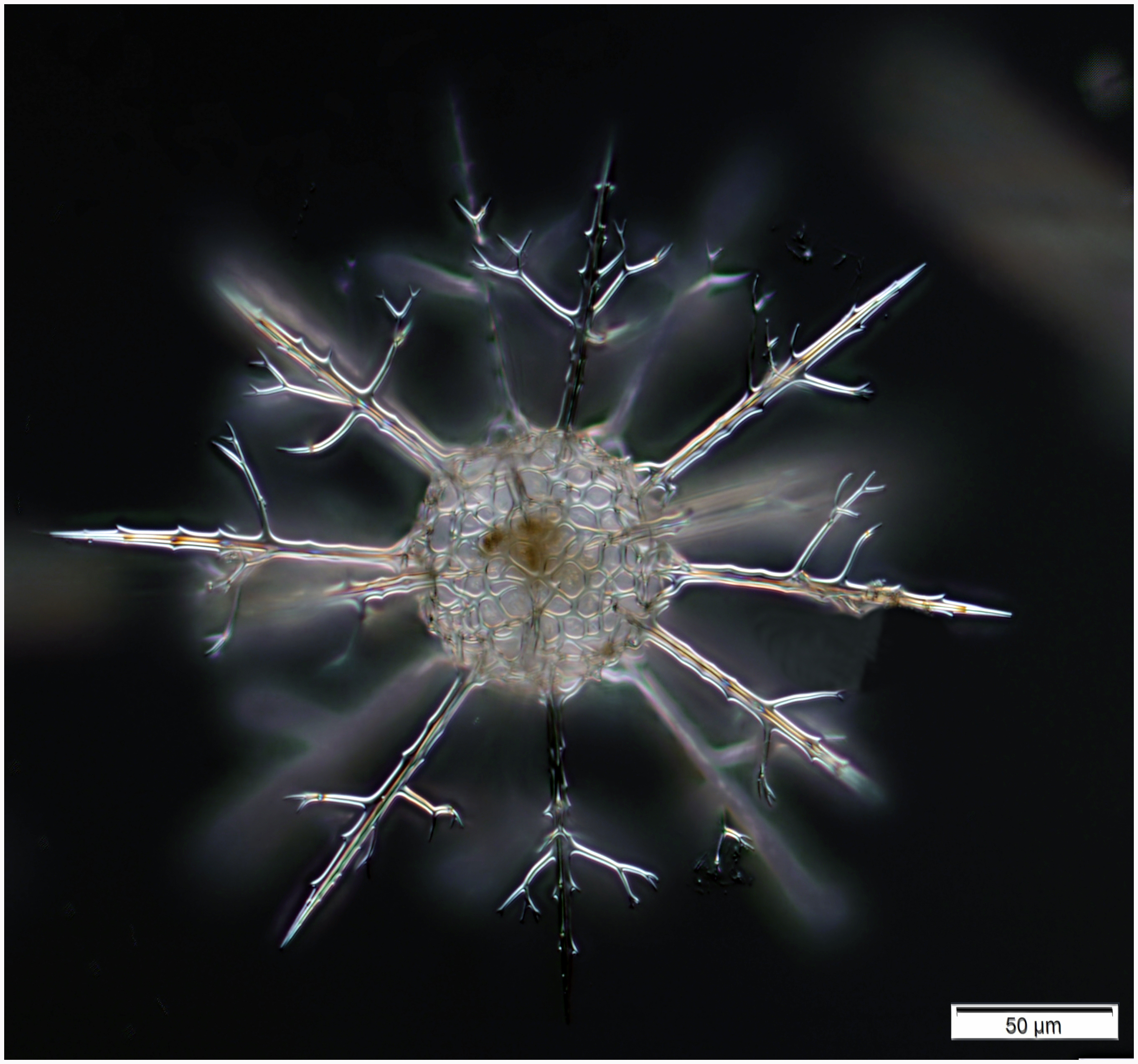
Cladococcus abietinus
Fossil radiolarian

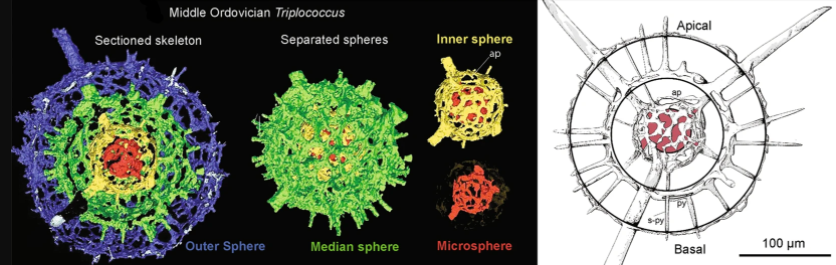
X-ray microtomography of Triplococcus acanthicus. This is a microfossil from the Middle Ordovician with four nested spheres. The innermost sphere is highlighted red. Each segment is shown at the same scale.

Turing and radiolarian morphology

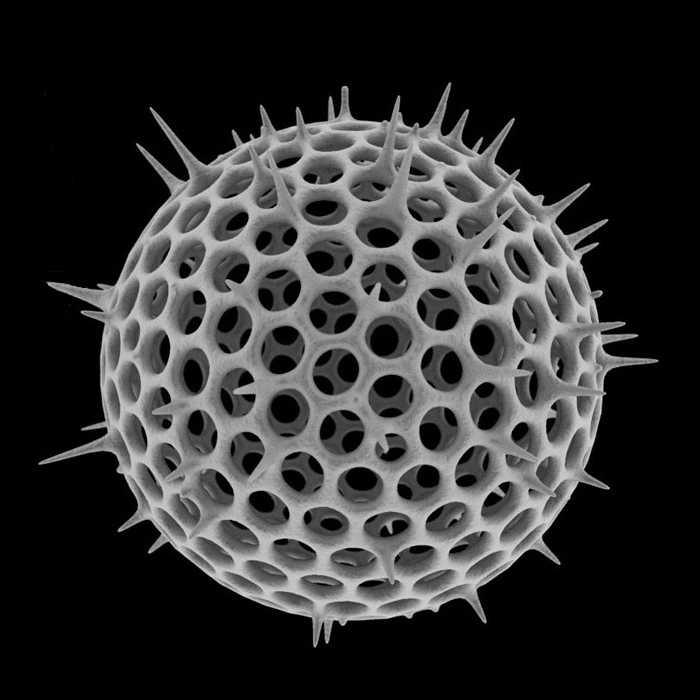
Shell of a spherical radiolarian

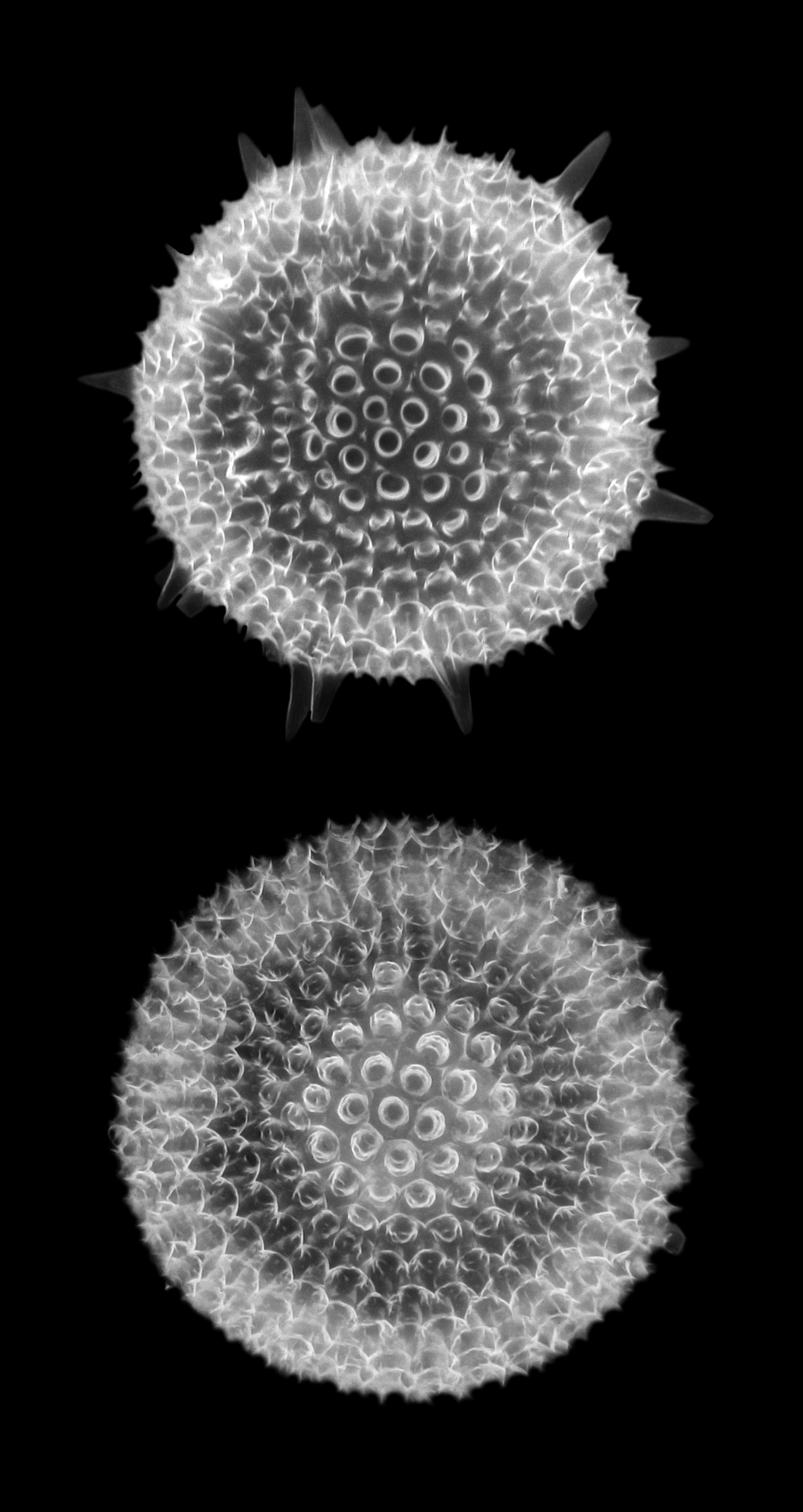
Shell micrographs

Computer simulations of Turing patterns on a sphere closely replicate some radiolarian shell patterns

External videos
- Radiolarian geometry
- Ernst Haeckel's radiolarian engravings

== Calcium-based shells ==
=== Coccolithophores ===
Coccolithophores are minute unicellular photosynthetic protists with two flagella for locomotion. Most of them are protected by a shell called a coccosphere. Coccospheres are covered with ornate circular plates or scales called coccoliths. The coccoliths are made from calcium carbonate. The term coccolithophore derives from the Greek for a seed carrying stone, referring to their small size and the coccolith stones they carry. Under the right conditions they bloom, like other phytoplankton, and can turn the ocean milky white.

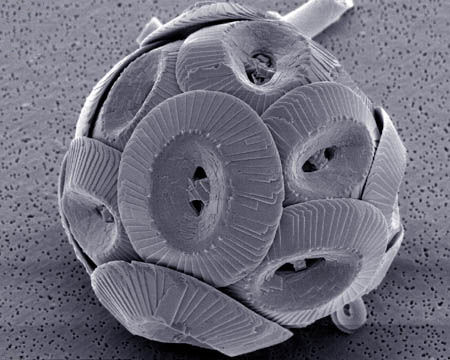

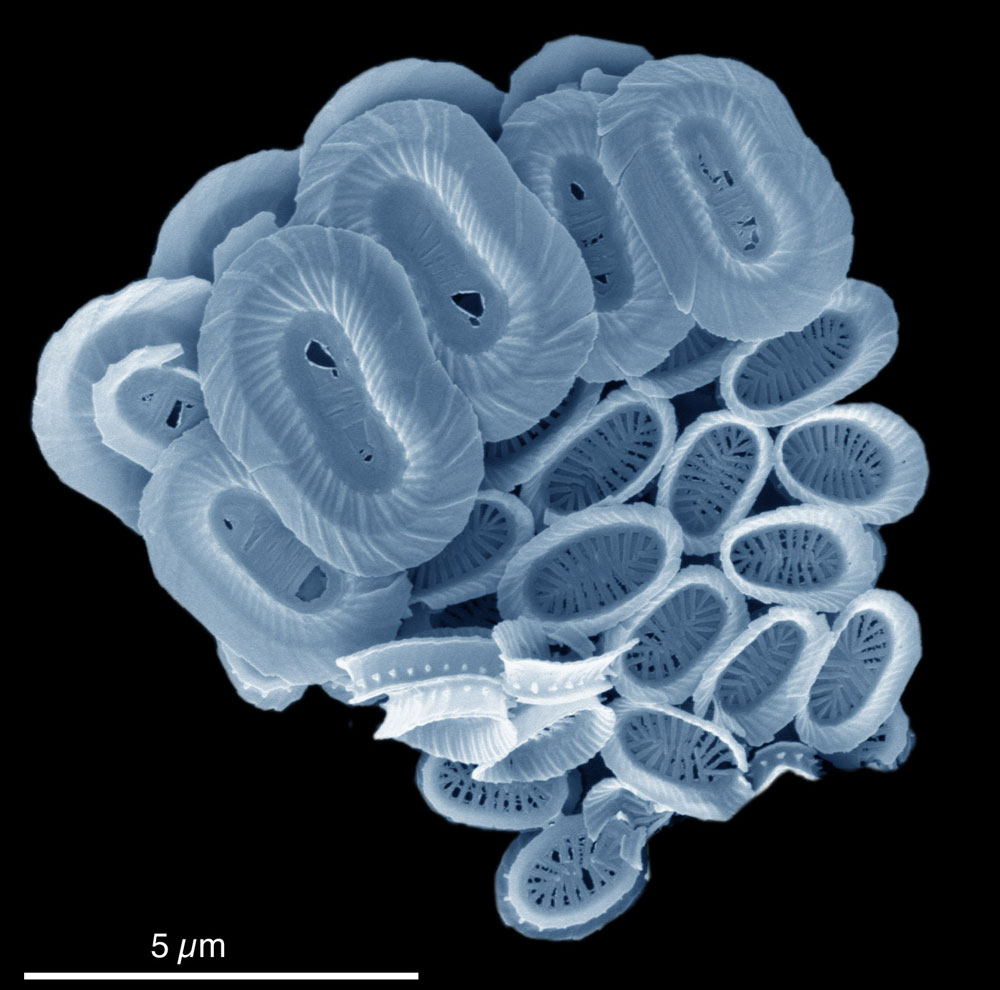
Coccolithophores named after the BBC documentary series The Blue Planet

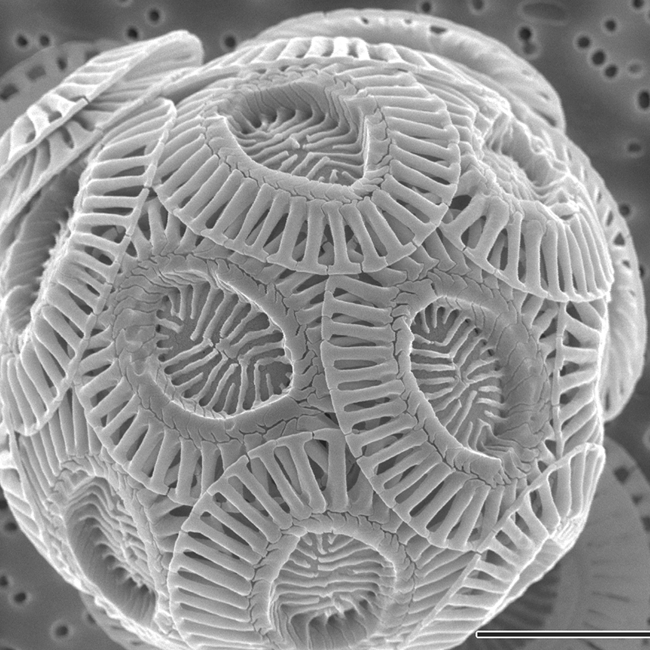
The coccolithophore Emiliania huxleyi
Coccolithophores

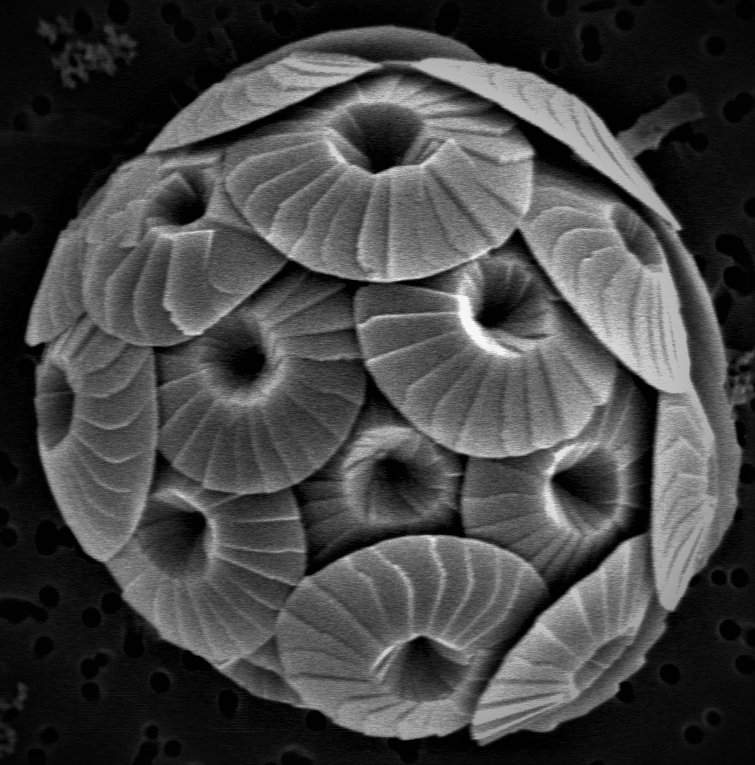
Have plates called coccoliths

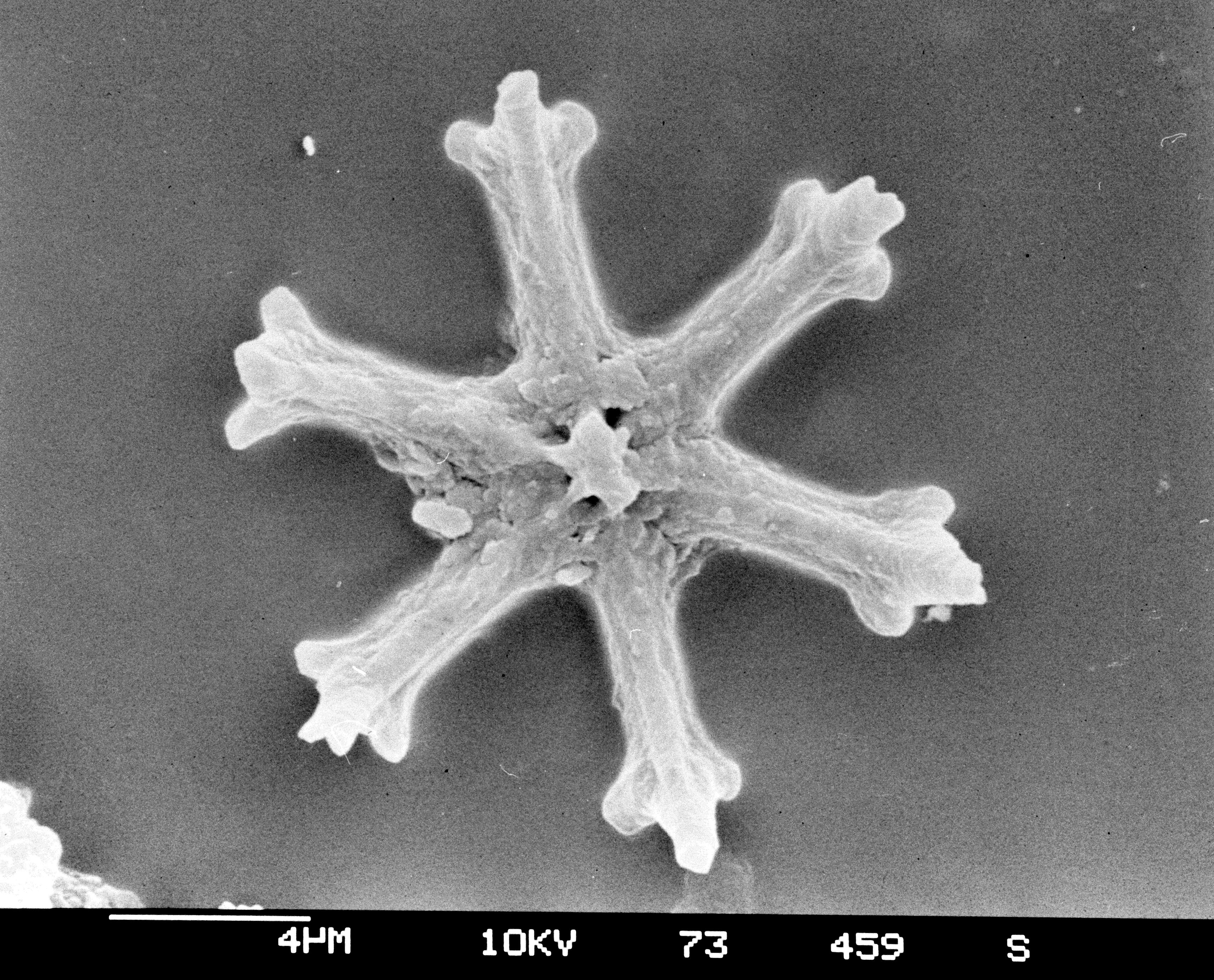
Extinct fossil

Coccolithophores build calcite skeletons important to the marine carbon cycle

There are benefits for protists that carry protective shells. The diagram on the left below shows some benefits coccolithophore get from carrying coccoliths. In the diagram, (A) represents accelerated photosynthesis including carbon concentrating mechanisms (CCM) and enhanced light uptake via scattering of scarce photons for deep-dwelling species. (B) represents protection from photodamage including sunshade protection from ultraviolet light (UV) and photosynthetic active radiation (PAR) and energy dissipation under high-light conditions. (C) represents armour protection includes protection against viral/bacterial infections and grazing by selective and nonselective grazers.

Benefits of having shells

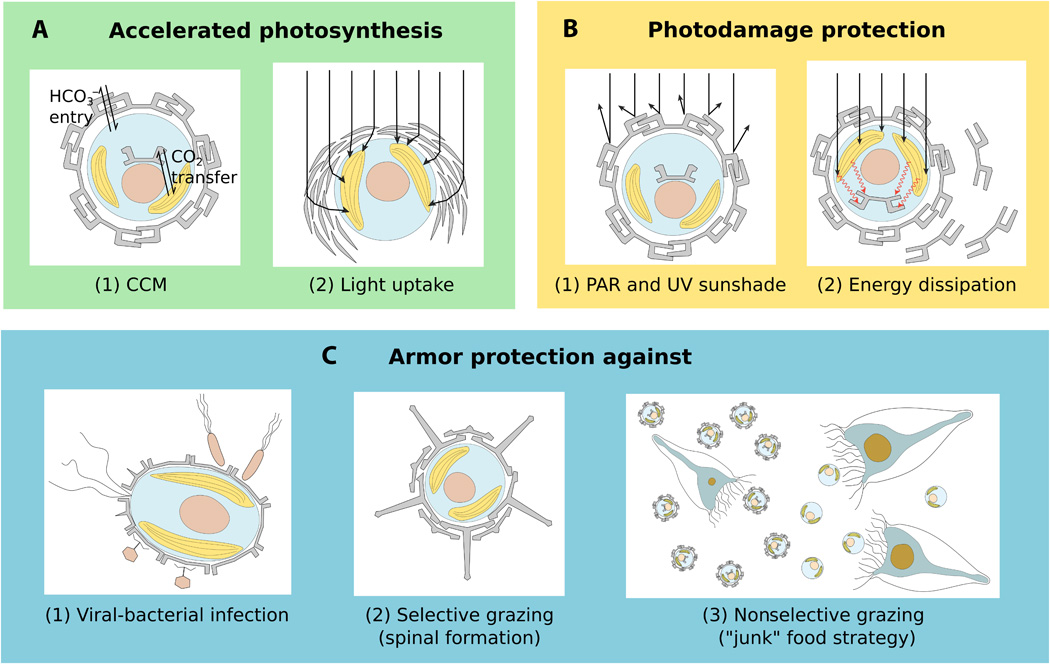
Benefits in coccolithophore calcification – see text above

Costs of having shells

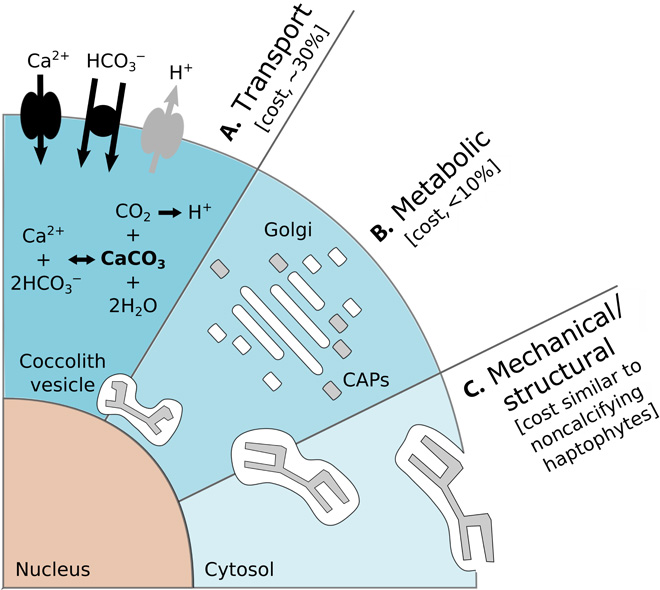
Energetic costs in coccolithophore calcification

There are also costs for protists that carry protective shells. The diagram on the right above shows some of the energetic costs coccolithophore incur from carrying coccoliths. In the diagram, the energetic costs are reported in percentage of total photosynthetic budget. (A) represents transport processes include the transport into the cell from the surrounding seawater of primary calcification substrates Ca_{2}+ and HCO_{3}− (black arrows) and the removal of the end product H+ from the cell (gray arrow). The transport of Ca_{2}+ through the cytoplasm to the coccolith vesicle (CV) is the dominant cost associated with calcification. (B) represents metabolic processes include the synthesis of coccolith-associated polysaccharides (CAPs – gray rectangles) by the Golgi complex (white rectangles) that regulate the nucleation and geometry of CaCO_{3} crystals. The completed coccolith (gray plate) is a complex structure of intricately arranged CAPs and CaCO_{3} crystals. (C) Mechanical and structural processes account for the secretion of the completed coccoliths that are transported from their original position adjacent to the nucleus to the cell periphery, where they are transferred to the surface of the cell.

=== Foraminiferans ===
Foraminiferan shapes
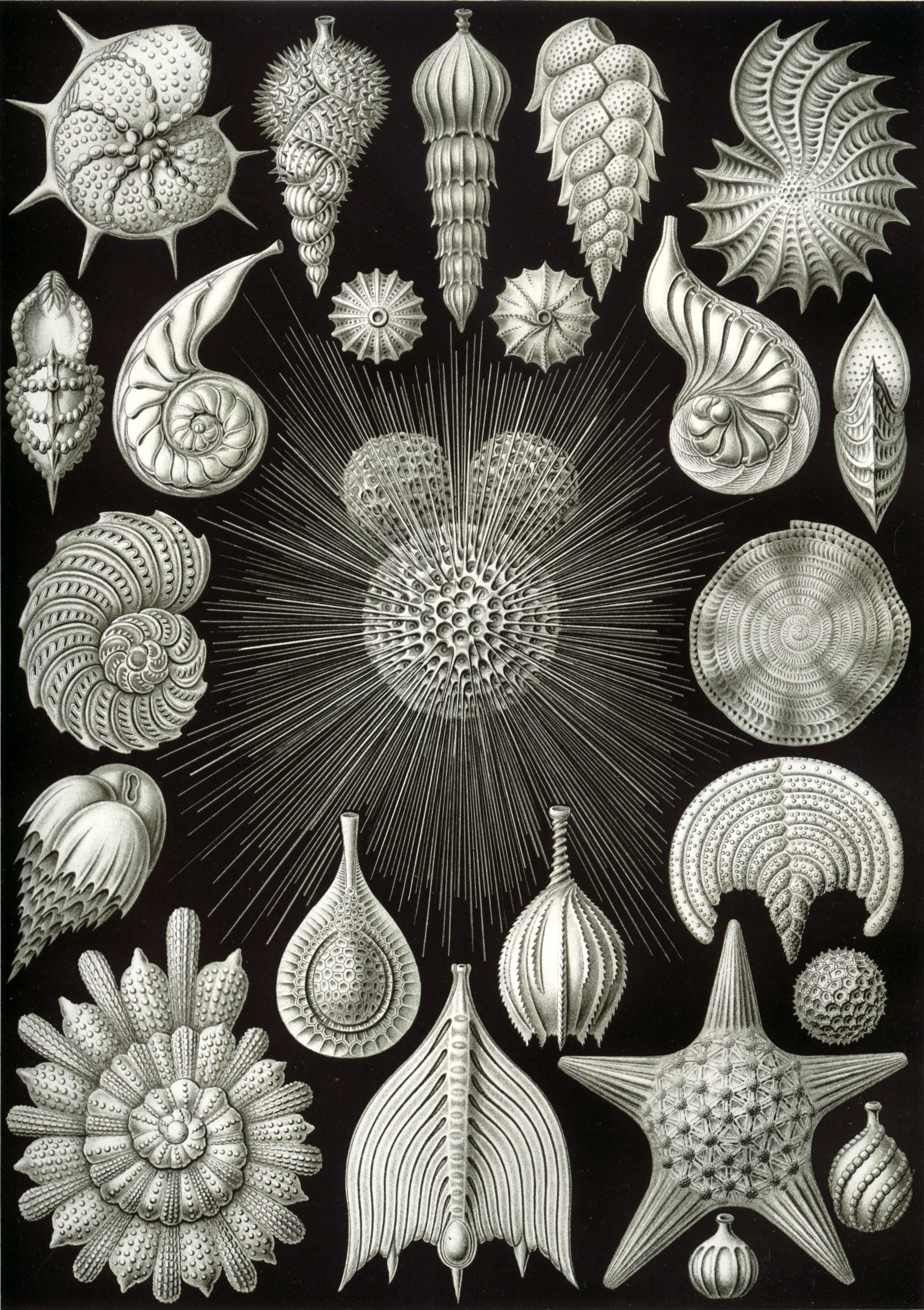
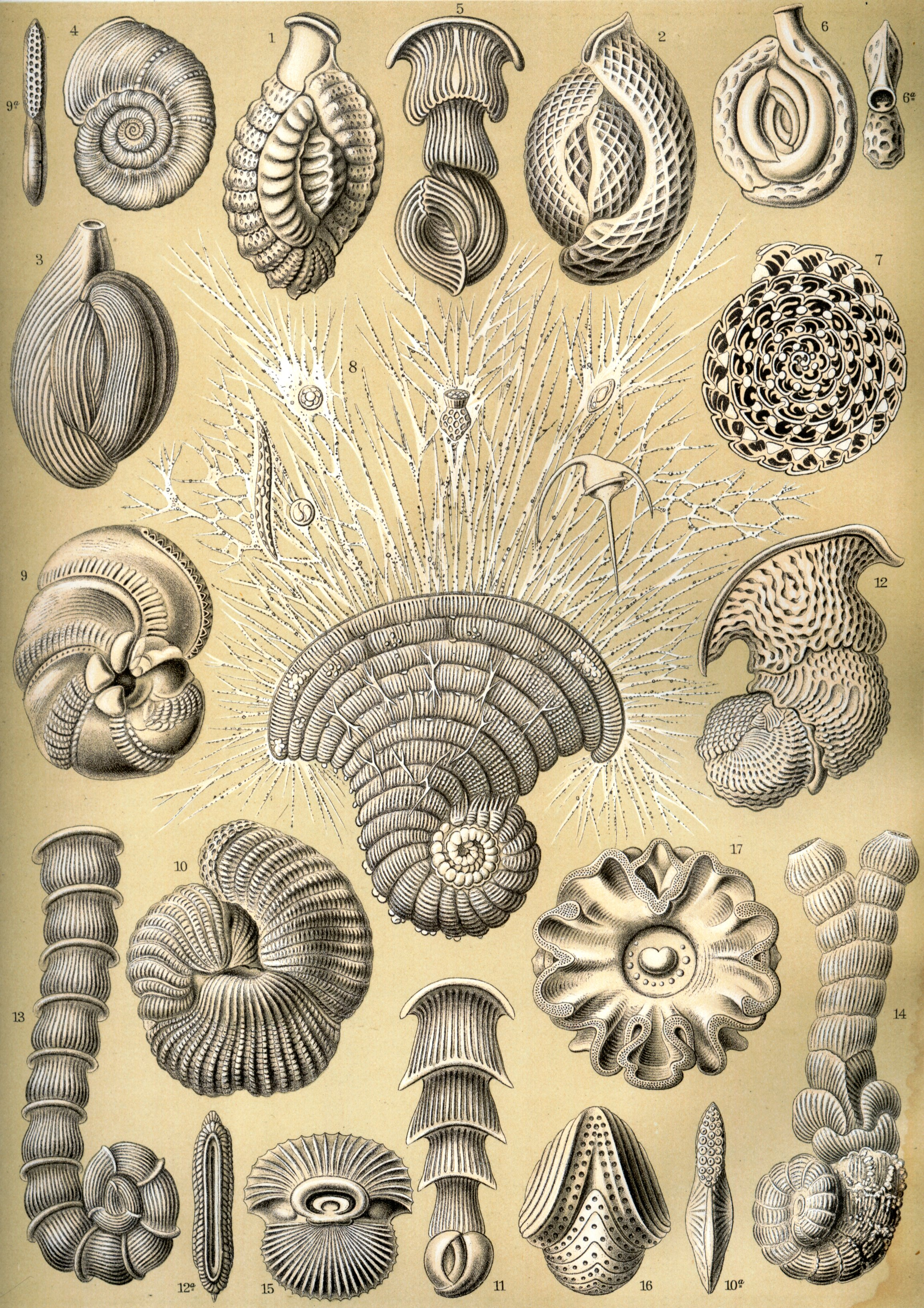
Drawings by Haeckel 1904

Like radiolarians, foraminiferans (forams for short) are single-celled predatory protists, also protected with shells that have holes in them. Their name comes from the Latin for "hole bearers". Their shells, often called tests, may be single-chambered or multi-chambered; multi-chambered forams add more chambers as they grow. The most famous of these are made of calcite, but tests may also be made of aragonite, agglutinated sediment particles, chitin, or (rarely) of silica. Most forams are benthic, but about 40 living species are planktic. They are widely researched with well established fossil records which allow scientists to infer a lot about past environments and climates. Some foraminifera lack tests altogether.

Foraminiferans

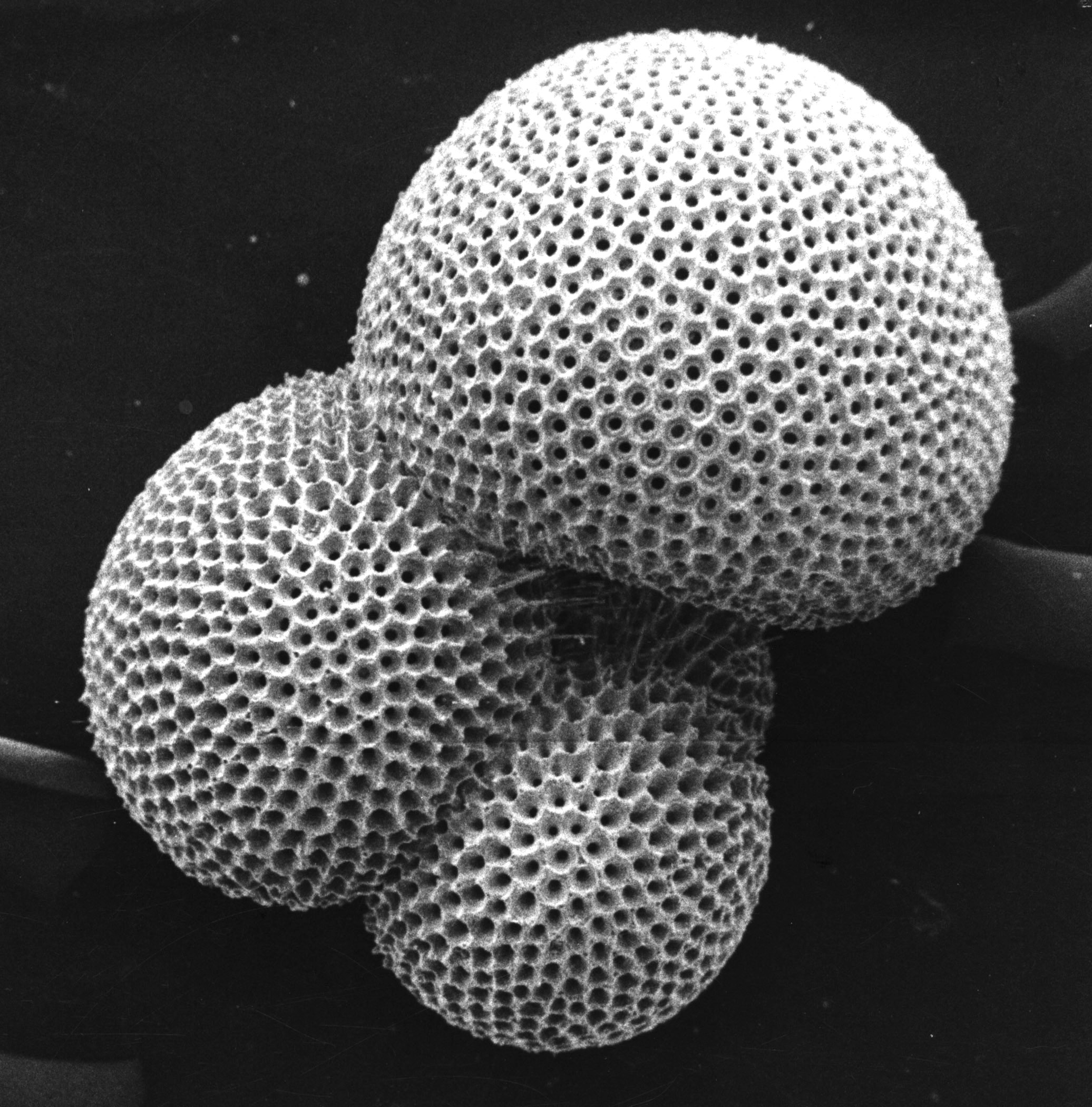
Empty Foraminiferan test, showing multiple chambers and pores

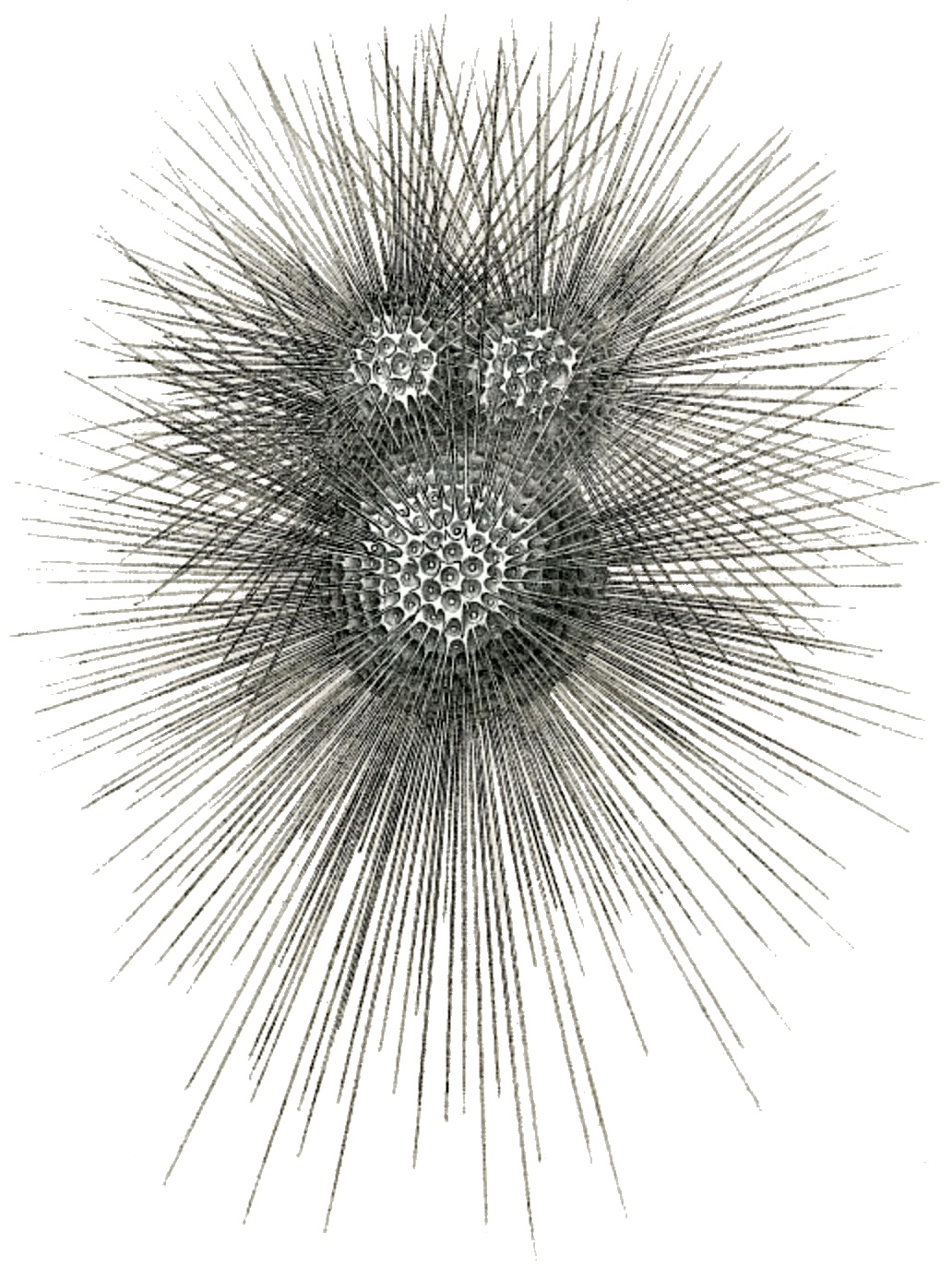
...and in life, showing pseudopodia streaming from pores

Foraminiferans are important unicellular zooplankton protists, often with calcite tests

External videos
- foraminiferans
- Foraminiferal networks and growth

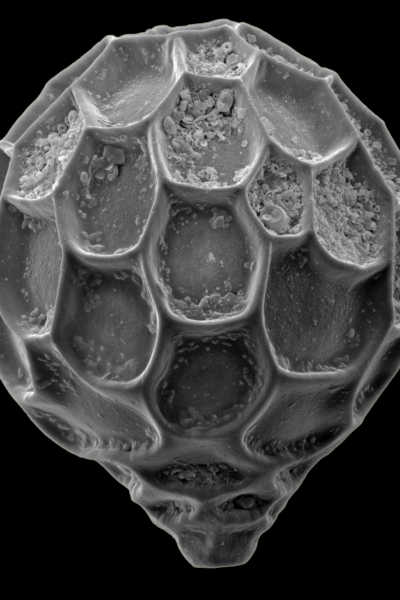
Benthic foraminifera Favulina hexagona, together with nanofossils enclosed inside the shell hexagons

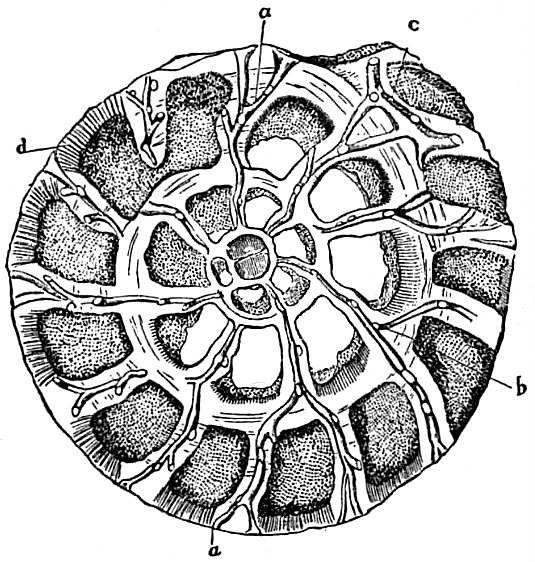
section showing chambers of a spiral foram

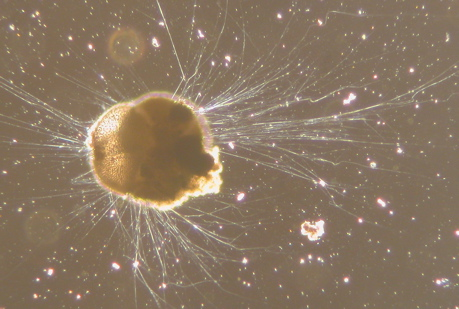
Live Ammonia tepida streaming granular ectoplasm for catching food

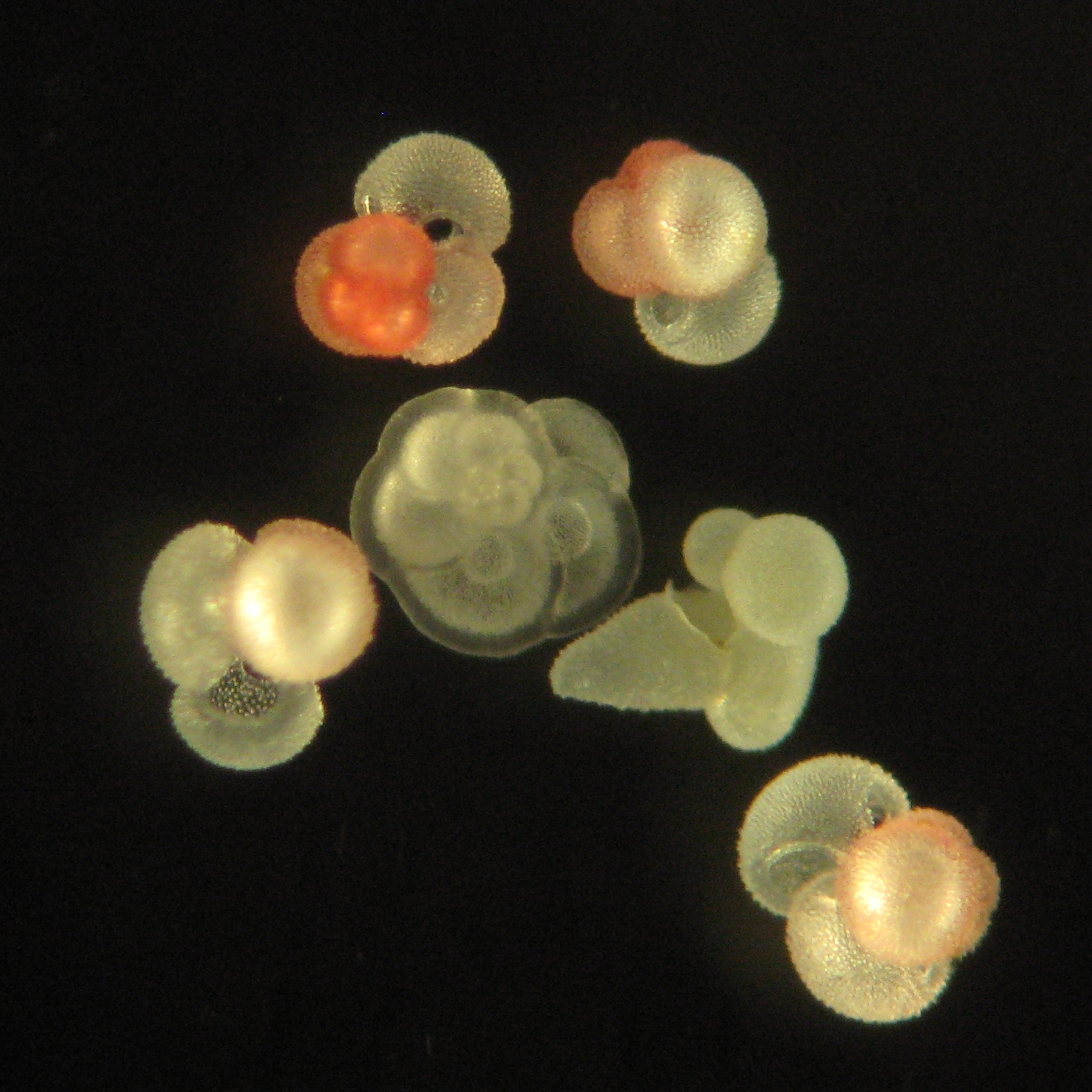
Group of planktonic forams

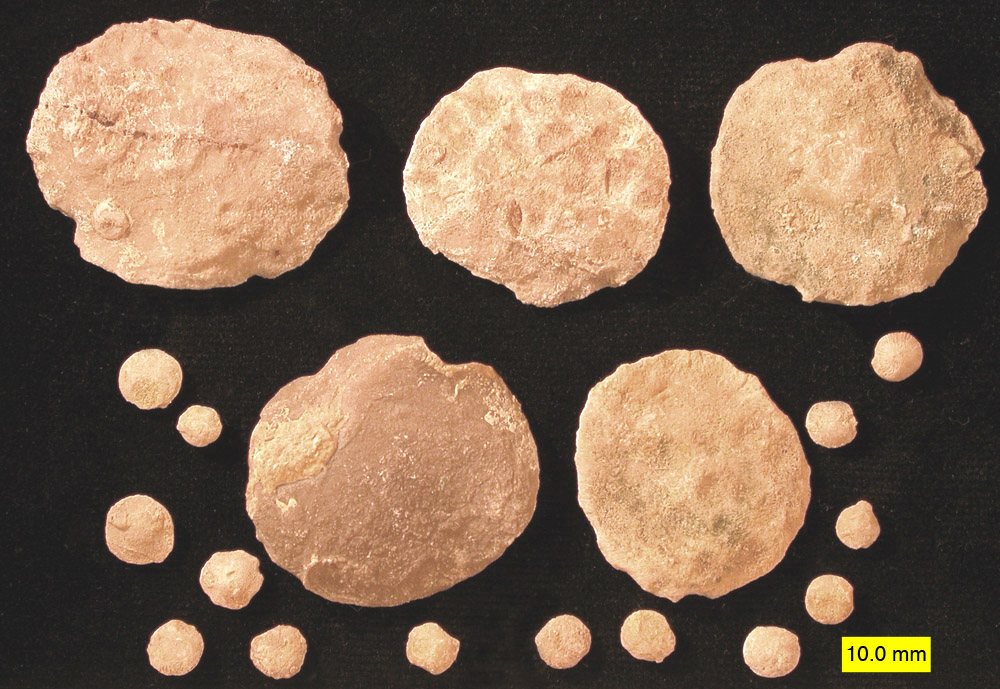
Fossil nummulitid forams of various sizes from the Eocene

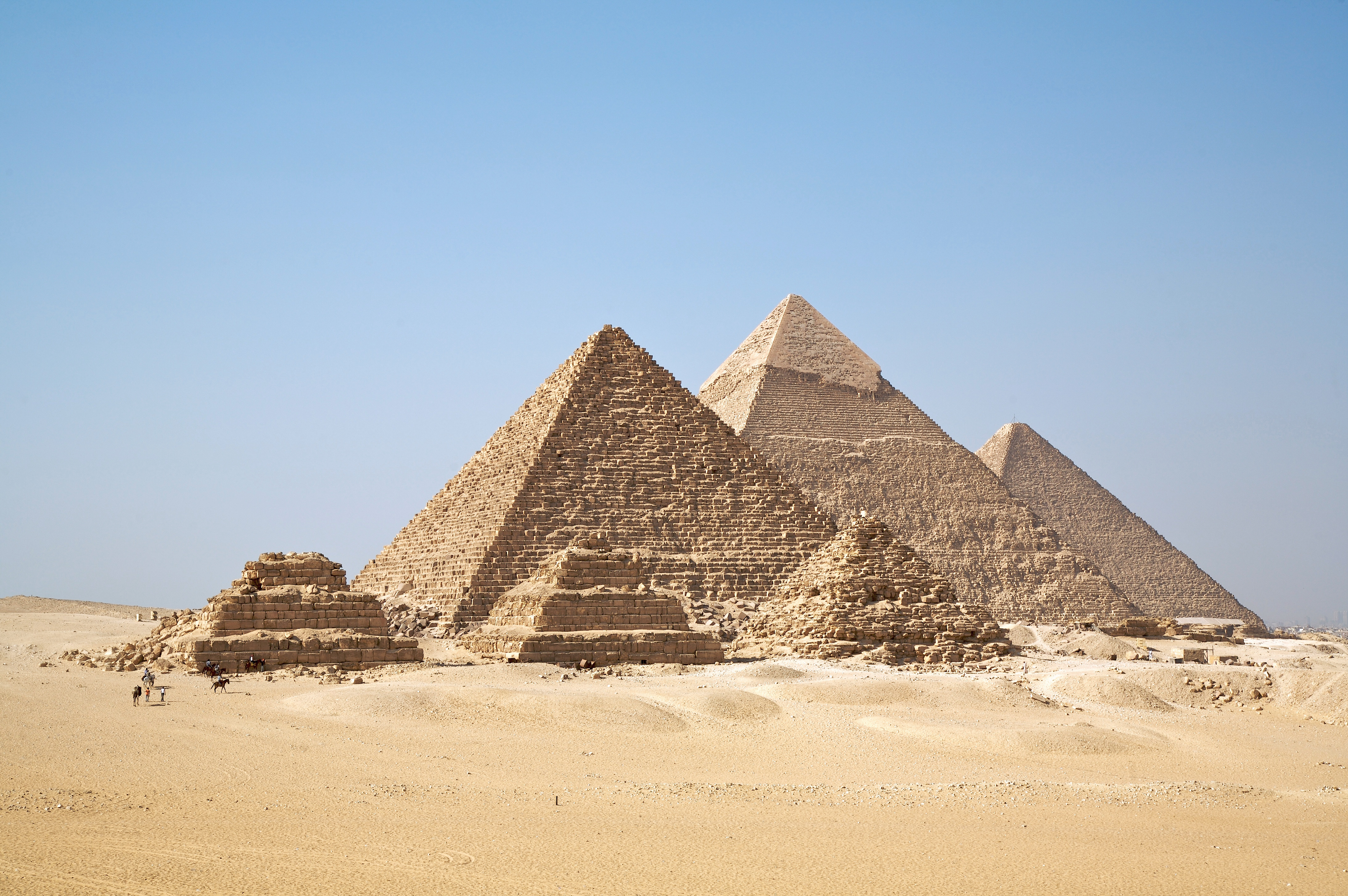
The Egyptian pyramids were constructed from limestone that contained nummulites.

== Other shells ==
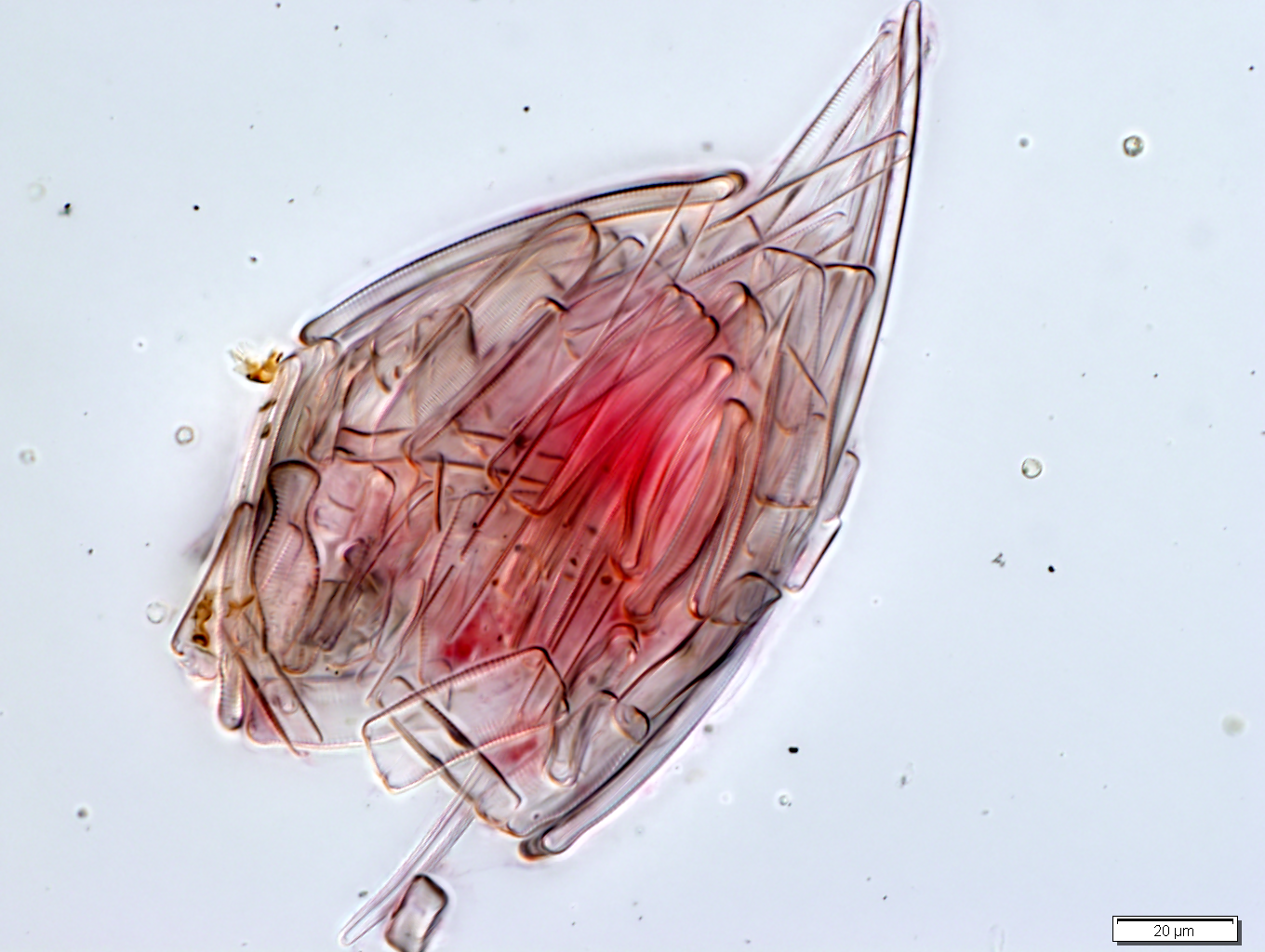
Testate amoeba

The cell body of many choanoflagellates is surrounded by a distinguishing extracellular matrix or periplast. These cell coverings vary greatly in structure and composition and are used by taxonomists for classification purposes. Many choanoflagellates build complex basket-shaped "houses", called lorica, from several silica strips cemented together. The functional significance of the periplast is unknown, but in sessile organisms, it is thought to aid attachment to the substrate. In planktonic organisms, there is speculation that the periplast increases drag, thereby counteracting the force generated by the flagellum and increasing feeding efficiency.

External videos
- Testate amoebas: blobby, modest shell dwellers – Journey to the Microcosmos

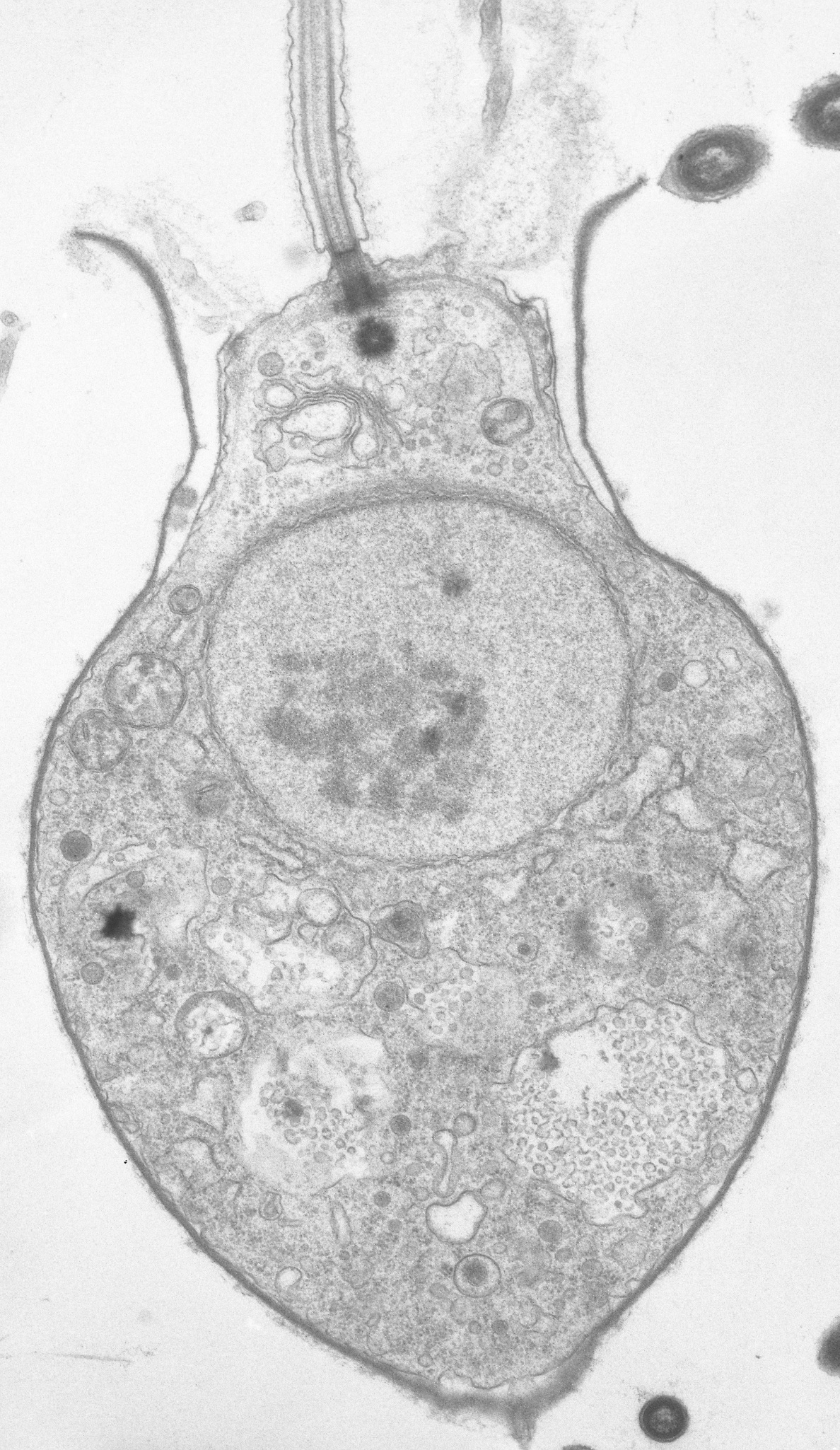
Choanoflagellate

== Microfossils and sediments ==
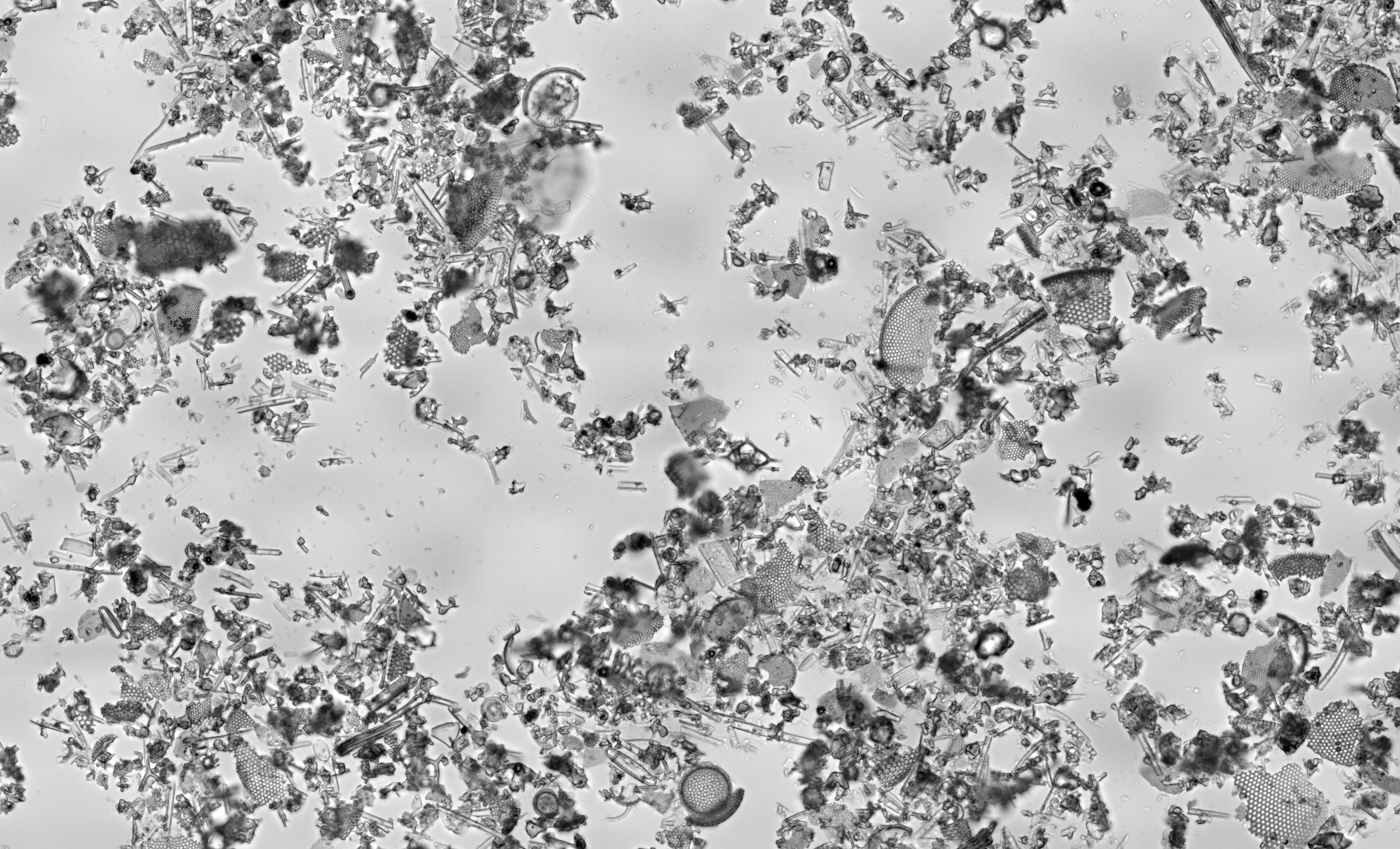
Diatomaceous earth is a soft, siliceous, sedimentary rock made up of microfossils in the form of the frustules (shells) of single cell diatoms. This sample consists of a mixture of centric (radially symmetric) and pennate (bilaterally symmetric) diatoms. Click 3 times to fully enlarge.

The shells or skeletons of many protists survive over geological time scales as microfossils. Microfossils are fossils that are generally between 0.001mm and 1 mm in size, the study of which requires the use of light or electron microscopy. Fossils which can be studied by the naked eye or low-powered magnification, such as a hand lens, are referred to as macrofossils.

Microfossils are a common feature of the geological record, from the Precambrian to the Holocene. They are most common in marine sediments, but also occur in brackish water, fresh water and terrestrial sedimentary deposits. While every kingdom of life is represented in the microfossil record, the most abundant forms are protist skeletons or cysts from the Chrysophyta, Pyrrhophyta, Sarcodina, acritarchs and chitinozoans, together with pollen and spores from the vascular plants.

In 2017, fossilized microorganisms, or microfossils, were discovered in hydrothermal vent precipitates in the Nuvvuagittuq Belt that may be as old as 4.28 billion years old, the oldest record of life on Earth, suggesting "an almost instantaneous emergence of life" (in a geological time-scale sense), after ocean formation 4.41 billion years ago, and not long after the formation of the Earth 4.54 billion years ago. Nonetheless, life may have started even earlier, at nearly 4.5 billion years ago, as claimed by some researchers.

== See also ==
- Cytoskeleton
- Particulate inorganic matter

== Further references ==
- Xu, K., Hutchins, D. and Gao, K. (2018) "Coccolith arrangement follows Eulerian mathematics in the coccolithophore Emiliania huxleyi". PeerJ, 6: e4608. doi:10.1126/science.aaa7378.
- Protistan Skeletons: A Geologic History of Evolution and Constraint
