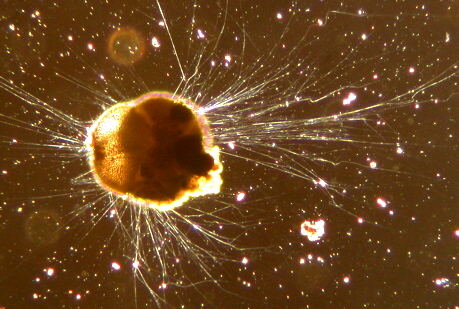
- Ammonia tepida

Scientific classification
- Domain: Eukaryota
- Supergroup: Rhizaria
- Phylum: Foraminifera
- Class: Globothalamea
- Order: Rotaliida
- Family: Ammoniidae
- Subfamily: Ammoniinae
- Genus: Ammonia; Brünnich, 1772

Type species
- Nautilus beccarii Linnaeus, 1758

Species
- Ammonia aberdoveyensis Haynes, 1973; Ammonia abramovichae Hayward & Holzmann, 2021; Ammonia advena (Cushman, 1922); Ammonia akitaae Hayward, Frenzel & Holzmann, 2021; Ammonia aoteana (Finlay, 1940); Ammonia arabica Kaushik, 2021; Ammonia ariakensis Akimoto, 2002; Ammonia batava (Hofker, 1951); Ammonia beccarii (Linnaeus, 1758); Ammonia bellaria Schönfeld, Beccari, Schmidt & Spezzaferri, 2021; Ammonia bradyi (Billman, Hottinger & Oesterle, 1980); Ammonia buzasi Hayward & Holzmann, 2021; Ammonia caspica Shchedrina in Mayer, 1968; Ammonia collinsi (Parr, 1932); Ammonia confertitesta Zheng, 1978; Ammonia convexa (Collins, 1958); Ammonia convexidorsa Zheng, 1978; Ammonia corallinarum (d'Orbigny in Deshayes, 1832); Ammonia debenayi Hayward & Holzmann, 2019; Ammonia decorata Golik, 1977; Ammonia differens McCulloch, 1977; Ammonia dilucida Shchedrina, 1984; Ammonia fajemilai Hayward & Holzmann, 2021; Ammonia falsobeccarii (Rouvillois, 1974); Ammonia glans Shchedrina, 1984; Ammonia goldsteinae Hayward & Holzmann, 2021; Ammonia goodayi Hayward & Holzmann, 2021; Ammonia haigi Hayward & Holzmann, 2021; Ammonia hattai Hayward & Holzmann, 2021; Ammonia heterogenea (Shchedrina, 1984); Ammonia irridescens (Arnal, 1958); Ammonia jacksoni Buzas, Smith & Beem, 1977; Ammonia japonica (Hada, 1931); Ammonia jorisseni Hayward, Holzmann & Renjaan, 2021; Ammonia justinparkeri Hayward & Holzmann, 2021; Ammonia karadagica (Dolgopolskaya & Pauli, 1931); Ammonia ketienziensis (Ishizaki, 1943); Ammonia kitazatoi Hayward & Holzmann, 2021; Ammonia morleyae Hayward & Holzmann, 2021; Ammonia moroensis Hofker, 1978; Ammonia neobeccarii Shchedrina & Mayer, 1975; Ammonia parasovica Shchedrina & Mayer, 1975; Ammonia parkinsoniana (d'Orbigny, 1839); Ammonia pauciloculata (Phleger & Parker, 1951); Ammonia paucipora Zheng, 1979; Ammonia pawlowskii Hayward & Holzmann, 2019; Ammonia rolshauseni (Cushman & Bermúdez, 1946); Ammonia rugulosa Parker, 2009; Ammonia shchedrinae Hayward & Holzmann, 2021; Ammonia sobrina (Shupack, 1934); Ammonia tepida (Cushman, 1926); Ammonia turgida (Hofker, 1951); Ammonia venecpeyreae Hayward & Holzmann, 2019; Ammonia veneta (Schultze, 1854)

Synonyms
- Challengerella Billman, Hottinger & Oesterle, 1980; Hammonia Soldani, 1789; Pseudohelenina Collins, 1974; Rolshausenia Bermúdez, 1952; Rotalia (Turbinuline); Strebloides Bermúdez & Seiglie, 1963; Streblus Fischer de Waldheim, 1817; Turbinulina Risso, 1826

= Ammonia (foraminifera) =

Genus of single-celled organisms

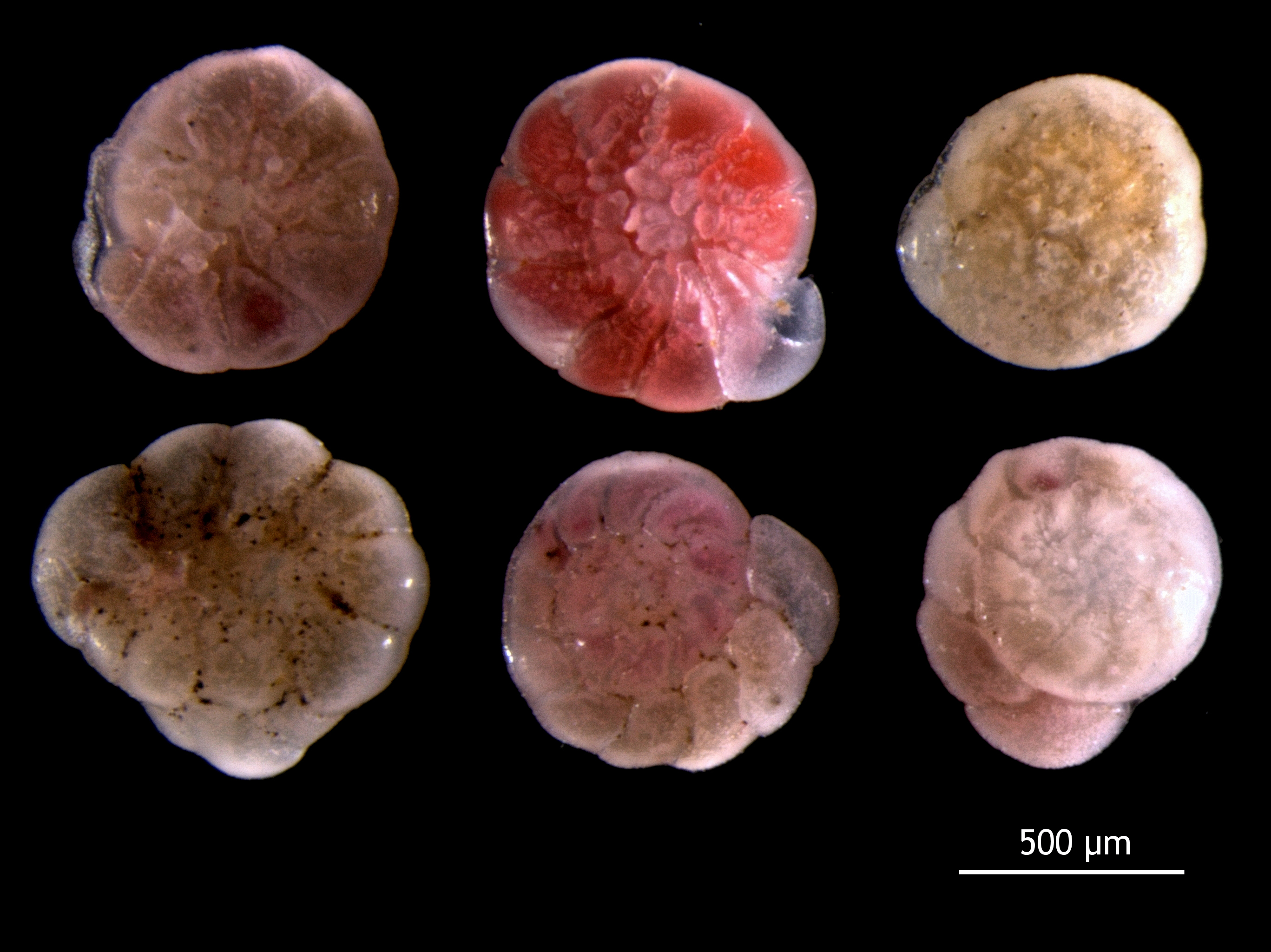
Ammonia beccarii, showing characteristic coiled shell

Ammonia is a genus of marine foraminifers. It is one of the most abundant foraminifer genera worldwide and is found in sheltered, shallow marine intertidal environments, sometimes in brackish waters.

== Species ==
The classification of the genus Ammonia in species is controversial. While several different forms exist, many authors consider the genus to consist of a single species, Ammonia beccarii, with many ecophenotypes. However, recent molecular studies revealed that the genus consists of many species, although they may be difficult to discriminate based on morphology.

Based on a comparison between molecular results and morphology, the following species appear to be valid:

- Ammonia aberdoveyensis Haynes, 1973
- Ammonia aomoriensis (Asano, 1951)
- Ammonia aoteana (Finlay, 1940)
- Ammonia batava (Hofker, 1951)
- Ammonia beccarii (Linnaeus, 1758)
- Ammonia convexa (Collins, 1958)
- Ammonia irridescens (Arnal, 1958) (maybe a synonym of A. tepida)
- Ammonia limnetes (Todd & Bronnimann, 1957)
- Ammonia sobrina (Shupack, 1934)
- Ammonia tepida (Cushman, 1926)

Additionally, several other molecular types have been discovered that do not match any of the described species and thus possibly represent new taxa.
