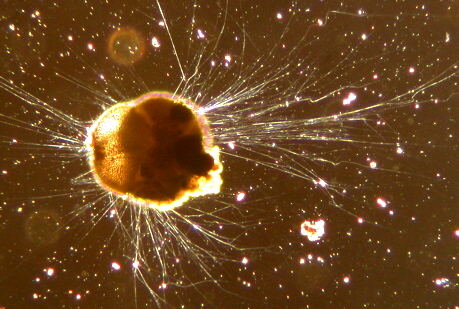

Scientific classification
- Domain: Eukaryota
- Clade: Sar
- Clade: Rhizaria
- Phylum: Retaria
- Subphylum: Foraminifera
- Class: Globothalamea
- Order: Rotaliida
- Family: Ammoniidae
- Genus: Ammonia
- Species: A. tepida

Binomial name
- Ammonia tepida Cushman, 1926

Synonyms
- Ammonia beccarii var. tepida Cushman, 1926; Rotalia beccarii var. tepida Cushman, 1926; Streblus beccarii var. tepida (Cushman, 1926)

= Ammonia tepida =

Ammonia tepida Temporal range: Cretaceous to recent

Species of single-celled organism

Ammonia tepida is a benthic foraminifer living in the sediment of brackish waters. It is very similar to Ammonia beccarii, but the latter lives on the surface of red algae. Once considered a globally widespread taxon, a recent genetic and morphological study has revealed that many of what were once considered members of A. tepida in fact represent other species of Ammonia, primarily Ammonia veneta, with true specimens of A. tepida only being found in Atlantic waters, off the coast of the Americas.

== Ecology ==
Ammonia tepida is found in the sediment of brackish waters. It is able to tolerate a wide range of temperatures and degrees of salinity, as well as to survive severe environmental conditions. As it is easy to keep in the laboratory, being able to reproduce both asexually and sexually without problem, it is considered an ideal organism for laboratory studies.

The diet of A. tepida consists mainly of other microorganisms. Algae form about 80–90% of its diet and the remaining is composed by bacteria. Laboratory experiments showed that it may also prey on small animals, such as nematodes, copepods and mollusk larvae.
