= Phycotoxin =

Toxic chemicals synthesized by algae

Phycotoxins (from Ancient Greek φῦκος (phûkos) 'seaweed' and τοξικόν (toxikón) 'poison, toxin') are complex allelopathic chemicals produced by eukaryotic and prokaryotic algal secondary metabolic pathways. More simply, these are toxic chemicals synthesized by photosynthetic organisms. These metabolites are (in most cases) not harmful to the producer but may be toxic to either one or many members of the marine food web. This page focuses on phycotoxins produced by marine microalgae; however, freshwater algae and macroalgae are known phycotoxin producers and may exhibit analogous ecological dynamics. In the pelagic marine food web, phytoplankton are subjected to grazing by macro- and micro-zooplankton as well as competition for nutrients with other phytoplankton species. Marine bacteria try to obtain a share of organic carbon by maintaining symbiotic, parasitic, commensal, or predatory interactions with phytoplankton. Other bacteria will degrade dead phytoplankton or consume organic carbon released by viral lysis. The production of toxins is one strategy that phytoplankton use to deal with this broad range of predators, competitors, and parasites. Smetacek suggested that "planktonic evolution is ruled by protection and not competition. The many shapes of plankton reflect defense responses to specific attack systems". Indeed, phytoplankton retain an abundance of mechanical and chemical defense mechanisms including cell walls, spines, chain/colony formation, and toxic chemical production. These morphological and physiological features have been cited as evidence for strong predatory pressure in the marine environment. However, the importance of competition is also demonstrated by the production of phycotoxins that negatively impact other phytoplankton species. Flagellates (especially dinoflagellates) are the principle producers of phycotoxins; however, there are known toxigenic diatoms, cyanobacteria, prymnesiophytes, and raphidophytes. Because many of these allelochemicals are large and energetically expensive to produce, they are synthesized in small quantities. However, phycotoxins are known to accumulate in other organisms and can reach high concentrations during algal blooms. Additionally, as biologically active metabolites, phycotoxins may produce ecological effects at low concentrations. These effects may be subtle, but have the potential to impact the biogeographic distributions of phytoplankton and bloom dynamics.

== Potential ecological effects ==
=== Anti-grazing effects ===
Phycotoxins may prevent grazing by several mechanisms: grazer death, infertility, or deterrence. Some evidence of anti-grazing effects:

1. Teegarden found that three different species of copepods were able to distinguish between a saxitoxin-producing Alexandrium sp. and morphologically similar non-toxigenic Alexandrium sp. by chemosensory means. These three different copepod species grazed predominantly on the non-toxigenic Alexandrium spp. and avoided the saxitoxin-producer. However, the effect of saxitoxin deterrence varied per copepod species. This implies that saxitoxin producing Alexandrium sp. have an advantage over non-toxigenic dinoflagellates.
2. Miralto et al. reported a low hatching success of eggs laid by copepods that fed on diatoms containing polyunsaturated aldehydes. When ingested by copepods, these aldehydes appear to arrest embryonic development. This has the potential to decrease the future population of copepods and promote the survival of copepods which do not eat as many diatoms.

=== Anti-microbial effects ===
Phycotoxins production may be useful to ward off parasitic or algicidal heterotrophic bacteria. Some evidence of anti-microbial effects:

1. Bates et al. was able to enhance domoic acid production in Pseudo-nitzschia multseries with the re-introduction of bacteria. Additionally, P. multiseries cultures which were completely axenic (bacteria-free), produce less domoic acid than P. multiseries cultures which have contained bacteria for several generations.
2. Sieburth found acrylic acid inhibited gut microflora in penguins. High concentrations of acrylic acid were ingested by penguins via their euphasid diet, which had been feeding on Phaeocystis. The antimicrobial effect of acrylic acid was verified by Slezak et al. who concluded that acrylic acid will inhibit bacterial production in situations where phytoplankton form aggregates (i.e. marine snow or Phaeocystis blooms). However, acrylic acid production may also serve to keep bacteria away from the phytoplankton in more dilute concentrations.

=== Competitive effects ===
Since many different species of phytoplankton compete for a limited number of nutrients (see Paradox of the Plankton), it's possible that phycotoxin production is used as a method to either kill competitors or to keep other phytoplankton out of the producer's nutrients space. Some evidence of competitive effects:

1. Graneli showed that Prymnesium spp. will produce phycotoxins which kill competitors under nitrogen or phosphorus limitation.
2. Fistarol et al. found that Alexandrium spp. produce toxins which decrease the growth rate of other phytoplankton and change community composition.
3. Prince et al. showed that chemical exudates from the dinoflagellate Karenia brevis decreased the growth rate and sometimes killed competitor species by decreasing their photosynthetic efficiency and increasing membrane permeability.

== List of known phycotoxins and mechanisms of action ==
Most characterized phycotoxins have some economic or health impact on humans. Other well-studied phycotoxins are potential or existing pharmaceuticals or have some use in cellular research. Therefore, our level of knowledge on individual toxins does not necessarily reflect their ecological relevance. Additionally, the mode of action and level of toxicity are effects that have been documented in macroorganisms (typically mice). These modes of action may be different in the pelagic marine environment. However, it is unlikely that the synthesis of complex and energetically expensive chemicals should be conserved over evolutionary time if they do not confer some advantage on the producer. Even if we do not yet know the effect of many toxins in their natural environment, their mere presence and impressive diversity indicates that they do serve some ecological purpose.

The phytoplankton species listed below do not encompass the entire range of known toxigenic species. There exists experimental evidence for phytoplankton species that have inhibitory effects on grazers or other phytoplankton species, but their toxins have not been identified.

Table generated using information from Cembella, Shimizu

Toxin group	Toxin producing species	Class	Characteristics	Mode of action	Structure
Domoic acid	Pseudo-nitzschia spp.	Bacillariophyceae	Hydrophilic N-toxin	Glutamate receptor agonist	
Saxitoxins (neosaxitoxins, gonyautoxins)	Alexandrium spp., Pyrodinium bahamense, Gymnodinium catenatum	Dinophyceae	Hydrophilic N-toxin	Na^{+}-channel blocker (site 1)	
Saxitoxins (neosaxitoxins, gonyautoxins)	Anabaena spp., Aphanizomenon spp., Cylindrospermopsis spp., Lyngbya spp., Planktothrix spp., Oscillatoria spp.	Cyanobacteria	Hydrophilic N-toxin	Na^{+}-channel blocker (site 1)	
Ciguatoxin	Gambierdiscus toxicus	Dinophyceae	Ladder-frame polyether	Na^{+}-channel activator (site 5)	
Gambieric acid	Gambierdiscus toxicus	Dinophyceae	Ladder-frame polyether		
Maitotoxins	Gambierdiscus toxicus	Dinophyceae	Ladder-frame polyether	Ca^{2+}-channel effector	
Osterotoxin	Ostreopsis lenticularis	Dinophyceae	Ladder-frame polyether	Unknown	
Cooliatoxin	Coolia monotis	Dinophyceae	Ladder-frame polyether	Unknown	
Brevetoxins	Karenia brevis, K. brevi-sulcata	Dinophyceae	Ladder-frame polyether	Na^{+}-channel activator (site 5)	
Brevetoxins	Chatonella marina, C. antiqua, C. cf. verruculosa	Raphidophyceae	Ladder-frame polyether	Na^{+}-channel activator (site 5)	
Yessotoxins	Protoceratium reticulatum, Lingulodinium polyedrum	Dinophyceae	Ladder-frame polyether	Affects cyclic AMP, cytotoxic	
Okadaic acid and dinophysistoxins	Dinophysis spp., Prorocentrum spp.	Dinophyceae	Linear polyether	Protein phosphatase inhibitor	
Pectenotoxin	Dinophysis fortii, D. acuta	Dinophyceae	Macrocyclic polyether	Unknown, hepatotoxic	
Azaspriracids	Protoperidinium crassipes	Dinophyceae	Linear polyether	Unknown, neurotoxic	
Gymnodimine	Karenia selliformis	Dinophyceae	Macrolide	Unknown, potentially neurotoxic	
Prymnesins	Prymnesium parvum	Prymnesiophyceae	Linear polyether	Unknown, potential Ca^{2+}-channel effector	
Spirolide	Alexandrium ostenfeldii	Dinophyceae	Macrocyclic polyether	Muscarinic receptor or cholinesterase inhibitor	
Ostreocin (palytoxin)	Ostreopsis siamensis	Dinophyceae	Linear polyether	Na^{+}/K^{+} ATPase disruptor	
Amphidinolide, Caribenolide	Amphidinium spp.	Dinophyceae	Macrocyclic polyether	Cytotoxic	
Goniodomin	Alexandrium spp.	Dinophyceae	Macrocyclic polyether		
Prorocentrolide	Prorocentrium lima	Dinophyceae	Macrocyclic polyether		
Scytophycins	Scytonema spp.	Cyanobacteria	Linear polyether	Cytotoxic	
Tolytoxin	Tolypothrix conglutinata var. colorata	Cyanobacteria	Linear polyether	Microfilament-depolymerizing agent	
Debromoaplysiatoxin	Lyngbya majuscula	Cyanobacteria	Linear polyether	Protein kinase C activator	
Amphidinols, Amphiketide	Amphidinium spp.	Dinophyceae	Open-chain polyketides	Antifungal	
Majusculamides, Curacins	Lyngbya majuscula	Cyanobacteria	Open-chain polyketide	Microtubulin assembly inhibitor	
Bacillariolides	Pseudo-nitzschia multiseries	Bacillariophyceae	Eicosanoid	Phospholipase A_{2} inhibitor	
Lyngbyatoxins	Lyngbya majuscula	Cyanobacteria	Prenylated amino acid derivative	Protein kinase C activator	
Polyunsaturated aldehydes		Bacillariophyceae	Polyunsaturated aldehydes	Anti-mitotic, apoptosis	
Euglenophycin	Euglena sanguinea	Euglenoidea	Polyketide		
Karlotoxin	Karlodinium veneficum	Dinophyceae	Polyketide / Polyether		
Karmitoxin	Karlodinium armiger	Dinophyceae	Polyketide / Polyether		

== Types of toxins ==
=== Excreted toxins ===
Excreted toxins may help deter predators and bacteria which are drawn in by phytoplankton waste products. Phytoplankton are known to excrete waste metabolites into the surrounding environment. This is a potential source of reduced nutrients and carbon for bacteria and may act as a signal for predators which can detect and follow kairomone gradients in their environment. Excreted toxins would seem most advantageous to the individual cell in their ability to keep predators and/or parasitic and algicidal bacteria at a distance. However, continuous toxin production and excretion carries a metabolic cost. For excreted toxins to be effective, they must have a low molecular weight to rapidly diffuse in the marine environment and to be energetically cheap to produce. However, excreted toxins may not actually repel larger motile predators because molecular diffusivity is slow and turbulence at the millimeter scale is large in water. Excreted phycotoxins may act as repellents if their signal registers at the same speed as other signals that potential grazers can detect (kairomones), assuming both are encountered by a predator at the same time. Additionally, excreted toxins may be effective method of keeping harmful bacteria and other phytoplankton competitors outside of the phycotoxin producer's microzone of nutrients.

=== Contact toxins ===
Contact toxins are effective if they impact the grazer or harmful bacterium immediately after contact with the phytoplankton producer. These toxins are located at the cell surface and are typically classified as glycoproteins, glycolipids, or polypeptides. These toxins would have to be highly specific to their target receptors to be effective.

=== Post-ingestion toxins ===
In order for these types of toxins to take effect, post-ingestion toxin producers have to be consumed by a grazer. Post-ingestion toxins, also known as suicide toxins, are not beneficial to individual cells because unlike terrestrial plants, phytoplankton do not have sacrificial tissue. However, if internal toxins do result in the death, decrease growth rate, infertility, or deterrence of a predator the remaining representatives of the plankton community may benefit. Community defense is most beneficial in a clonal population where toxigenic species are abundant, for example during a monospecific phytoplankton bloom.

=== Chemical defense signal mechanisms ===
Table modified from Wolfe (2000)

	Excreted toxins	Contact toxins	Post-ingestion toxins
Molecules	Small molecules but varied structures; organic and amino acids, sugars, short-chain lipids and derivatives	Glycoproteins, glycolipids, polypeptides	Varied: toxicants or toxins
Toxin properties	Aqueous solubility, diffusivity, lability, toxicity	Specificity, toxicity	Toxicity or concentration
Toxin location	Aqueous environment	Cell surface	Cell interior
Effect or mode of action	Negative kinesis/taxis: repellent	Release following capture: deterrent	Subsequent inhibition of feeding or toxicity reduced digestibility or growth efficiency
Benefit level	Individual or population, including competitors	Individual	Genetically similar population

== Detection methods ==
It is technically difficult to identify and characterize a metabolite that is produced in low concentrations and is secreted into a fluid that contains a diversity of other metabolites. Allelopathy is very difficult to observe in the field (with the exception of harmful algal blooms) because phycotoxin production may be induced by a variety of environmental factors and may create a cascade of biotic and physical events, which are difficult to separate from direct allelopathic effects of one species on another. There are six points (similar in logic to Koch's postulates) that must be established to rigorously prove that one species is chemically inhibiting another in an ecological system

1. a pattern of inhibition of one species [...] by another must be shown
2. the putative aggressor [species] must produce a toxin
3. there must be a mode of toxin release from the [species] into the environment
4. there must be a mode of toxin transport and/or accumulation in the environment
5. the afflicted [species] must have some means of toxin uptake
6. the observed pattern of inhibition cannot be explained solely by physical factors or other biotic factors, especially competition and herbivory:
7. concentrations which impact the target species must be environmentally realistic given rates of transport and diffusion in the aquatic environment

Few (if any) studies on phytoplankton toxins have attempted to rigorously meet all of these criteria. All methods of detecting phycotoxins involve extraction of the candidate toxin from a phytoplankton culture; therefore, it's important to determine whether the toxin is secreted into the media or stored in the phytoplankton cell. It's also important to know whether the target organism must be present to induce toxin synthesis.

Most commonly, the presence of a phycotoxin is verified by bioassay-guided fractionation. The sample must be fractionated, or separated from the other metabolites and chemicals in the media using chromatography. These different fractions may be then tested on the target species to determine which sample causes the expected allelopathic symptom(s). This approach is useful for rapidly isolating an allelochemical whose structure is not known. However, bioassays have the potential to generate false positives. This may occur if the bioassay is not controlled properly. For example, in a mixed batch culture the target species may die or have reduced growth rates due to competition for nutrients, dissolved inorganic carbon, or pH levels which are too low for the target species.

Developments in genomics, transcriptomics, proteomics, and metabolomics are now yielding large volumes of biochemical data. "Metabolic profiling" allows for comparison between biologically active and inactive samples and identification of compounds present at low concentrations using mass spectrometry. These samples may then be compared by principal component analysis. Characterization of the compounds present in the active sample (but not in the inactive sample) may then be identified and characterized using standard methods in mass spectroscopy. Isotope labeling may also be used to identify the pathways used in phycotoxin biosynthesis.

== See also ==
- Allelopathy
- Antipredator adaptation
- Chemical defenses
- Chemical ecology
- Fish kill
- GEOHAB
- Harmful algal blooms
- Phytotoxin
- Plankton
- Plant defense against herbivory
