= Mixotrophic dinoflagellate =

Plankton

Dinoflagellates are eukaryotic plankton, existing in marine and freshwater environments. Previously, dinoflagellates had been grouped into two categories, phagotrophs and phototrophs. Mixotrophs, however include a combination of phagotrophy and phototrophy. Mixotrophic dinoflagellates are a sub-type of planktonic dinoflagellates and are part of the phylum Dinoflagellata. They are flagellated eukaryotes that combine photoautotrophy when light is available, and heterotrophy via phagocytosis. Dinoflagellates are one of the most diverse and numerous species of phytoplankton, second to diatoms.

Dinoflagellates have long whip-like structures called flagella that allow them to move freely throughout the water column. They are mainly marine but can also be found in freshwater environments. Combinations of phototrophy and phagotrophy allow organisms to supplement their inorganic nutrient uptake This means an increased trophic transfer to higher levels in food web compared to the traditional food web.

Mixotrophic dinoflagellates have the ability to thrive in changing ocean environments, resulting in shifts in red tide phenomenon and paralytic shellfish poisoning. It is unknown as to how many species of dinoflagellates have mixotrophic capabilities, as this is a relatively new feeding-mechanism discovery.

== Species ==
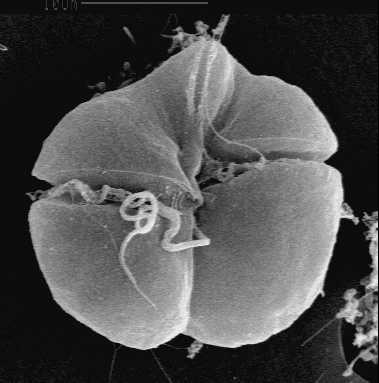
Karenia brevis

Some dinoflagellates that live as parasites are probably mixotrophic. Karenia, Karlodinium, and Lepidodinium are some of the dinoflagellate genera which are thought to contain peridinin, a carotenoid pigment necessary for photosynthesis in dinoflagellates; however, chlorophyll b has been found in these genera as an accessory pigment. This discovery has led scientists to assume that the pigment chlorophyll b actually came from prey which had been ingested by the dinoflagellates. Some species of mixotrophic dinoflagellate are able to feed on toxic prey such as toxic algae and other toxic organisms. For example, Lingulodinium polyedra and Akashiwo sanguinea are two species of mixotrophic dinoflagellates that are known to feed on the toxic dinoflagellate, Alexandrium tamarense. Certain species of mixotrophic dinoflagellates can be affected by light intensity and nutrient conditions . For example, ingestion rates of Fragilidium subglobosum, Gymnodinium gracilentum, and Karlodinium veneficum increase as light intensity increases up to 75 to 100 μmol photons per m^{2} per second. In contrast, other species are not affected by light intensity. As well, ingestion rates of the mixotrophic dinoflagellate Ceratium furca are affected by intracellular nutrient concentrations.

== Types of feeding ==
Marine dinoflagellate species undergo three major trophic modes: autotrophy, mixotrophy and heterotrophy. Many species of dinoflagellates were previously assumed to be exclusively autotrophic; however, recent research has revealed that many dinoflagellates that were thought to be exclusively phototrophic are actually mixotrophic. Mixotrophic dinoflagellates can undergo both photosynthesis and phagocytosis as methods of feeding. Mixotrophic dinoflagellates with individual plastids that depend mostly on photosynthesis can prey on other cells as their secondary source of nutrients. On the other hand, mixotrophic dinoflagellates with individual plastids that depend mainly on phagocytosis are also photosynthetic due to chloroplasts 'stolen' from their prey (kleptochloroplasts) or because of algal endosymbionts. It was discovered that the mixotrophic dinoflagellates Gonyaulax polygramma and Scrippsiella spp. can engulf small-size prey using their apical horn while larger prey are engulfed via their sulcus, showing that dinoflagellates can have more than one mouth for feeding. Moreover, mixotrophic dinoflagellates belonging to the species Karlodinium armiger, can capture small prey by direct engulfment or can use an extendable peduncle to capture larger prey.

== Implications for microbial food webs ==
Mixotroph dinoflagellates belonging to the species Gymnodinium sanguineum feed on nanociliate populations in Chesapeake Bay. Predation on ciliates is advantageous for G. sanguineum as the ciliates provide a source of nitrogen which is limiting to the growth of purely photosynthetic dinoflagellates. By preying on ciliates, these dinoflagellates reverse the normal flow of material from primary producer to consumer and influence the trophodynamics of the microbial food web in Chesapeake Bay

Several established ecological models of marine microbial food webs have not included feeding by mixotrophic dinoflagellates. These additions would include feeding by mixotrophic dinoflagellates on bacteria, phytoplankton, other mixotrophic dinoflagellates and nanoflagellates, and heterotrophic protists. The impact of grazing by mixotrophic dinoflagellates will affect particular prey species and be influenced by the abundance of dinoflagellate predators and their ingestion rates. Another consideration would be to include predator-prey relationships of mixotrophic dinoflagellates at a species level due to co-existence in offshore and oceanic waters.

The diversity of mixotrophic dinoflagellate species and their interactions with other marine organisms contributes to their diverse roles in different niche environments. For example, mixotrophic and heterotrophic dinoflagellates may act as predators on a wide range of prey types due to their diverse feeding mechanisms. Including mixotrophic dinoflagellates would better explain the control of prey population and cycling of limited materials as well as competition between other organisms for larger prey.

== Climate change and ocean acidification ==
As CO_{2} concentrations in the atmosphere increase via anthropogenic causes, acidification of the ocean will increase as the result of increasing CO_{2} sequestration by the ocean; the ocean is a great sink for carbon, absorbing more as its concentration in the atmosphere increases. As this occurs, there will be species and community composition shifts in marine plankton communities. Mixotrophic dinoflagellates will be favoured over photosynthetic dinoflagellates, as the oceans will become more nutrient limited and mixotrophs will not have to rely only on inorganic nutrients but will be able to take advantage of being able to consume particulate organic matter.

With an increase in temperature, there is an increase in water column stability, which leads to favourable conditions for mixotrophic growth. Mixotrophs can grow in low nutrient (more stable) environments and become dominant members of planktonic communities. Harmful algal blooms (HABs) can be caused by increased stability or increases in nutrients due to acidification and climate change, as well. This can have large impacts on the food chain and pose harmful effects to humans and their food sources through harmful blooms of dinoflagellates and other taxa, and lead to paralytic shellfish poisoning, for example.

== Influence on red tide and HABs ==
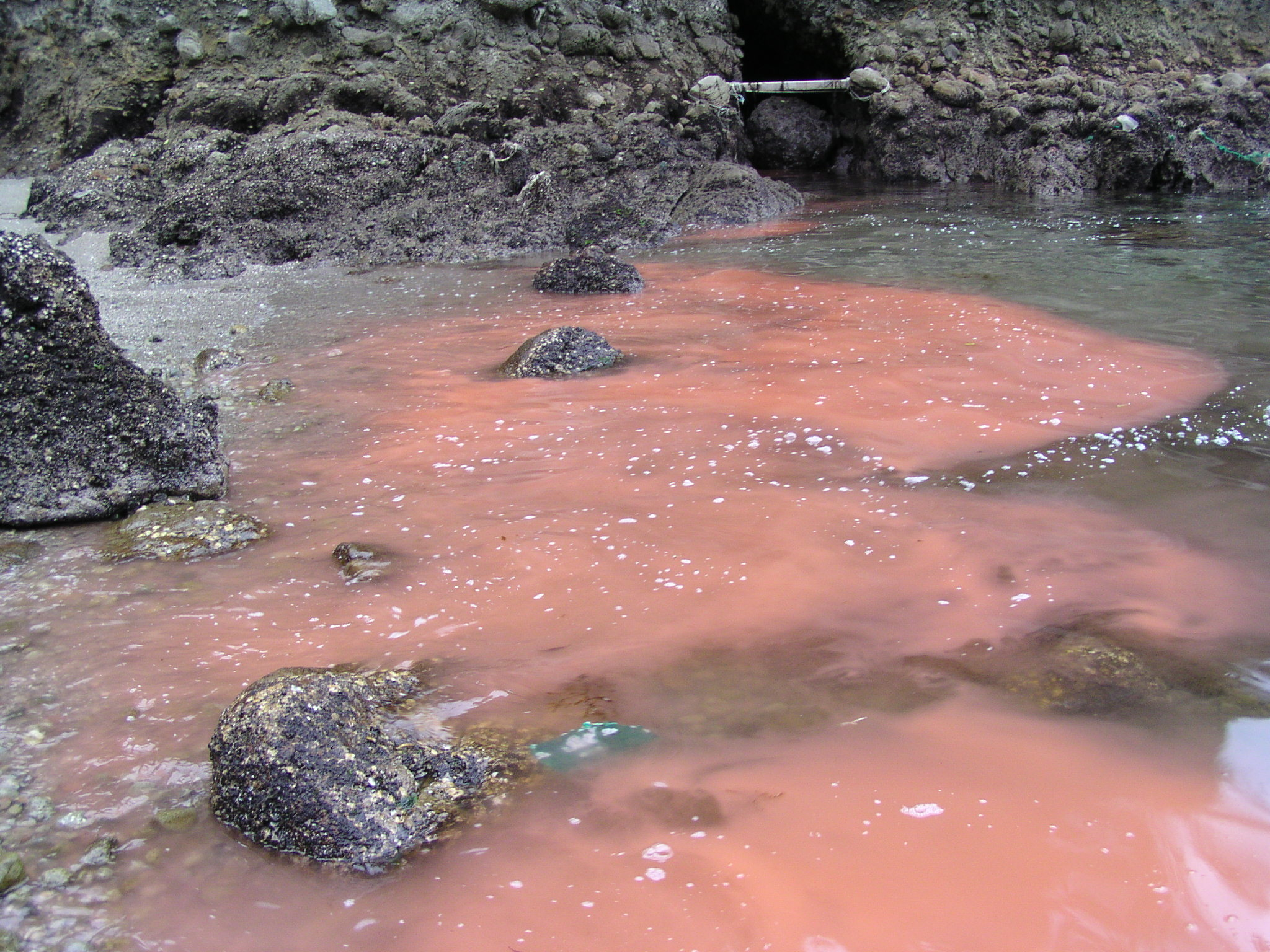
Algal bloom (akasio) by Noctiluca spp. in Nagasaki

Many mixotrophic and some heterotrophic dinoflagellates are known to cause red tides or harmful blooms that result in large-scale mortality of fish and shellfish. Studies on red tides have been conducted to determine the mechanism of outbreak and the persistence of red tides caused by mixotrophic dinoflagellates such as Karenia brevis, Prorocentrum donghaiense and Prorocentrum minimum in low nutrient concentration waters. In the case of serial red tides, one mixotrophic dinoflagellate species is dominated by another mixotrophic species in rapid succession over a short span of days. A possible explanation for the occurrence of different dominant mixotrophic dinoflagellates during serial red tides is the ability of mixotrophic dinoflagellates to feed on both heterotrophic bacteria and cyanobacteria (such as Synecchococcus) spp., which provide limiting nutrients such as phosphorus, and nitrogen simultaneously. It is proposed that during serial red tides, feeding by larger mixotrophic dinoflagellates on smaller species may be a driving force for the succession of dominant species. Nitrogen and phosphorus is taken up by direct transfer of the materials and energy between the mixotrophic dinoflagellates; therefore, nutrient supply does not rely on the release of nitrogen and phosphorus by other organisms. Hence, mixotrophy can cause uncoupling between nutrient concentrations and the abundance of mixotrophic dinoflagellates in natural environments.

Red tides are a type of harmful algal bloom (HABs); both are the result of massive proliferation of algae that result in very high concentrations of cells that visibly colour the water. The very high levels of biomass in Red Tides or HABs can have direct toxic effects through the release of toxic compounds or indirect effects through oxygen depletion on mammals, fish, shellfish, and humans. PSP (Paralytic Shellfish Poisoning) is one example of a toxin that is produced by dinoflagellates that can have lethal consequences if contaminated shellfish are ingested; the toxin is a neuro-inhibitor that is concentrated in the flesh of bivalves and molluscs that have fed on toxic algae The toxin concentrations can cause harmful and even deadly effects on humans and marine mammal populations that feed on contaminated shellfish.

== Relationship to other organisms ==
Mixotrophic dinoflagellates can feed on various organisms including bacteria, picoeukaryotes, nanoflagellates, diatoms, protists, metazoans and other dinoflagellates, as well. Feeding and digestion rates in mixotrophic dinoflagellates are lower than those in strictly heterotrophic dinoflagellates. Mixotrophic dinoflagellates do not feed on blood, eggs, adult metazoans, and flesh, such as occurs in some heterotrophic dinoflagellates.
