= 2025 algal bloom in South Australia =

Harmful algal bloom event

2025 South Australian Harmful Algal Bloom
- Sea foam at the West Beach Boat Harbour, 22 October 2025
- Map Marine areas affected by the bloom
- Date: March 2025 – ongoing
- Location: Gulf St Vincent; Spencer Gulf; Investigator Strait; Backstairs Passage
- Type: Mass fish kill
- Cause: Marine heatwave; Coastal upwelling
- Website: algalbloom.sa.gov.au/

A harmful algal bloom (HAB) event that started in March 2025 is ongoing along the coasts of the state of South Australia as of February 2026. It has caused fish kills impacting the marine environment and associated fishing and aquaculture industries, as well as beachgoers and tourism operators along the affected coasts. The state government has set up an information website and hotline dedicated to the event, and the state and federal governments are working together on mitigation of the bloom. Temporary fishing restrictions on certain species, starting 1 November 2025, have been imposed to allow them to recover. The environment ministers responsible are Lucy Hood (SA) and Murray Watt (Federal).

The causes of the bloom are attributed to flooding of the River Murray in 2022-23 that brought extra nutrients into the sea; a cold-water upwelling in summer 2023-24 that lifted more nutrients to the surface; and a marine heatwave that has occurred since September 2024. These changes, particularly the latter, have been attributed to climate change. The algae are not considered a significant health concern, although people who experience an allergic reaction such as asthma, coughing, or itchy eyes should not stay in close proximity to foamy or discoloured water.

== Background and extent ==
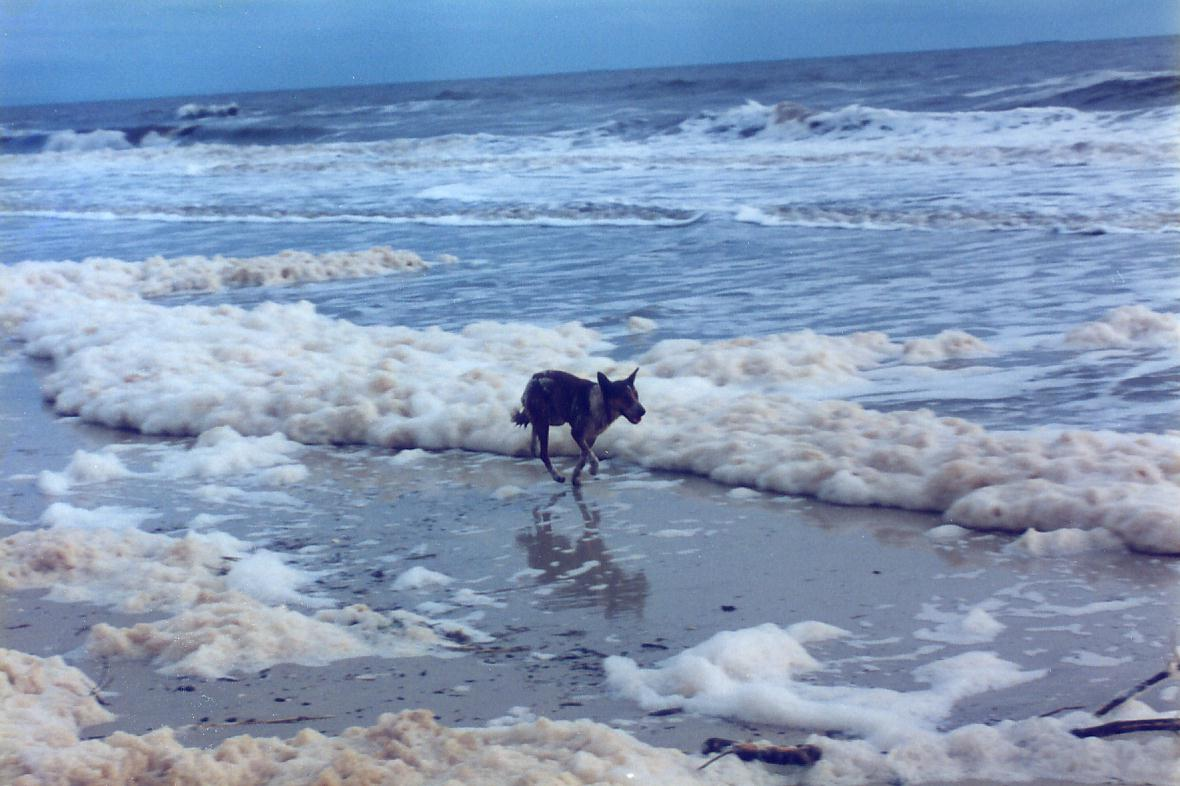
Sea foam at West Beach after a storm and following decay of an algal bloom in October 1996

In March 2025, a marine heatwave-induced bloom, initially identified as consisting mainly of the dinoflagellate Karenia mikimotoi, was blamed for the deaths of thousands of marine creatures, as well as coughing, sore eyes, and blurry vision in humans, along stretches of beach along the south coast of the Fleurieu Peninsula in South Australia. Despite hopes that winter storms would cause the bloom to dissipate, relatively mild conditions (potentially attributed to climate change) caused it to persist and spread along adjacent coasts of Kangaroo Island and Gulf St Vincent (including Adelaide's metropolitan beaches) and into the Coorong.

By the middle of the year, the state government estimated the size of the bloom as around the same size as Kangaroo Island, which covers over 4,000 km^{2} (1,500 sq mi) (about 80 times the size of Sydney Harbour). By October 2025, the bloom had spread on the currents, into both Gulf St Vincent (flanking the Yorke and Fleurieu Peninsulas) and Spencer Gulf, along the coast of the Eyre, as well as to Kangaroo Island itself. Marine biologist Mike Steer, chief executive of the South Australian Research and Development Institute (SARDI), estimates that it has affected around 30 per cent of the state's coastline, roughly equivalent to 1,500 km (930 mi). He said that its extent and duration is unprecedented in both South Australia and Australia, and is probably one of the top ten recorded blooms in the world. The densest occurrence of the bloom, manifesting in foam, was occurring on the stretch down the coast from the top of Gulf St Vincent down to Brighton Beach.

=== Species composition ===
Besides K. mikimotoi, other Karenia species including K. brevisulcata and K. longicanalis have been found to be present in the bloom, as well as others yet to be identified. Collaborating with SARDI and independent local consultants, marine biologists from Flinders University, University of Technology Sydney and the University of Tasmania are involved in studying the bloom, with specialist marine toxicological expertise being sought from the Cawthron Institute in New Zealand.

In November 2025 researchers announced that they had tentatively identified K. cristata as having been the dominant species present for much of the time in the bloom, and that this little-known species (one of five Karenia species present, including K. papilionacea) is responsible for the brevetoxins detected in shellfish, and the probable cause of the respiratory symptoms experienced by surfers when the first reports of the bloom were made in March. K. cristata is the only species of the five present in the bloom which has been found capable of producing brevetoxins. As it was previously unknown in Australian waters – the only other reports having come from South Africa and Newfoundland – there were suggestions that it may have been introduced through ballast water, although this is considered to be highly unlikely, due to its physical fragility. In July 2026, new research found that laboratory-grown strains of K. cristata were exceptionally toxic to marine organisms, even in much lower concentrations than had been found in the ocean.

DNA sequencing has been used to identify the species present in the bloom, and K. brevis, the only other known brevetoxin-producing Karenia species, has not been found.

== Possible causes ==
According to the Australian government website in May 2025, the bloom has been building up over time, and its causes may be attributable to the following events: Floodwaters from the River Murray in 2022-23 bringing extra nutrients into the sea, a cold-water upwelling in summer 2023-24 that lifted more nutrients to the surface and a marine heatwave since September 2024, raising water temperatures by about 2.5C. However, scientists later said that this was an unlikely cause, as the time lag between the events was too great.

According to the not-for-profit Biodiversity Council, (Note: "...an independent expert group founded by 11 Australian universities to promote evidence-based solutions to Australia’s biodiversity crisis", whose lead councillors include Hugh Possingham) marine ecologists have warned that ocean warming and marine heatwaves associated with climate change, as well as nutrient pollution, have led to a rise in the number of algal blooms, and this is likely to continue. The Australian Marine Conservation Society agrees with the assessment that climate change has driven the bloom, calling the event a "crisis" and a "warning we can’t ignore".

Claims that the bloom may have been caused by the Adelaide Desalination Plant have been dismissed by researchers as misinformation.

== Impact ==
As of November 2025, 20,000 km^{2} and about 30% of South Australia coastline are impacted.

Although not produced by K. mikimotoi, brevetoxins produced by other Karenia species have been detected in commercial shellfish farms, leading to temporary closures, and in foam washed up on beaches, with health authorities issuing advice for asthmatics.

The bloom has killed more than 500 species of fish, penguins, and marine mammals, and has also caused health problems such as asthma, skin and eye irritation, and coughing in humans. It has affected the aquaculture, fishing and tourism industries, especially local fishers, as well as the many residents who live along the coastline and surfers who frequent popular surfing spots such as Port Elliot. Several groups of First Nations peoples have called the ongoing bloom a "cultural emergency". The Narungga people of Yorke Peninsula have been heavily affected by the bloom. The Goolwa Pipi Co., which harvests a small edible saltwater clam known as the Goolwa pipi, was no longer able to harvest and sell their shellfish. Large areas of kelp, seagrass, and shellfish reefs, which tend to filter nutrients, have been lost. In addition, the gulfs around the South Australian peninsulas, especially Gulf St Vincent, are more susceptible to HABs because they have less water exchange than open ocean coastlines, and the water is shallower, which increases its heating capacity.

It was feared that the bloom would affect the breeding season of the unique population of giant cuttlefish in the northern Spencer Gulf, in a sanctuary area that received National Heritage status in 2023, the Cuttlefish Coast Sanctuary Zone. This population of the species is even distinct from the population in the southern Spencer Gulf, and the only population of giant cuttlefish in the world to breed in a mass event, in a spectacular display of colours, including blue, purple, green, red and gold, which change as they mate and lay eggs. This makes it a popular tourist attraction. See below for the device created by SARDI to protect some of the cuttlefish, an air-bubble curtain generator.

In the seven days preceding 3 October 2025, clearing of beaches along the coast collected around 1,600 kg (3,500 lb) of marine animals, including longsnout boarfish, whiting, and leatherjacket fish. The previous week of hand-clearing netted a total of two tonnes of dead sea life.

According to head of SARDI Mike Steer on 3 October 2025, the algae and the brevetoxins they produce are "not significant health concerns", and there is no need to stay away from the water. He himself has continued to surf. However, if the water is discoloured or foamy, and a person is susceptible to itchy eyes, coughing, or other irritation, they should move away.

The local seafood industry has suffered a downturn, despite assurances that fish caught in SA waters are safe to eat, and many fisheries have been completely unaffected by the bloom; consumer confidence dropped owing to the news describing the bloom as "toxic" or "harmful". The shellfish-harvesting region around Stansbury on the Yorke Peninsula was closed for nearly eight months.

It was discovered in late October that, according to SARDI data, that the numbers of squid, garfish, and King George whiting had been severely depleted in Gulf St Vincent and around Kangaroo Island, while some other species, such as blue crabs, had also declined.

Some of the species affected by the algal bloom at West Beach
Abalone
3 July 2025

Port Jackson shark
3 July 2025

Longsnout boarfish
22 October 2025

Juvenile leatherjackets
30 November 2025

== Early predictions ==
Early model predictions by oceanographer Jochen Kaempf of Flinders University, reported on 22 July 2025, suggested that the algal bloom may shrink over winter but then spread to new areas in summer, including both Gulf St Vincent and Spencer Gulf. This modelling scenario was also featured in Robert Simms' motion for the establishment of a Joint Committee on the Algal Bloom by the South Australian Parliament.

== Responses and suggestions ==
=== Government responses ===
Signage posted at beaches and jetties

The state government briefed federal Environment Minister Murray Watt on 11 June 2025, who engaged with then state environment minister Susan Close during the following months. At that time, the HAB was expected to dissipate over the winter months.

The state government created a website to provide information to the public, and issued vouchers to encourage tourists. To complement the website, a telephone hotline was launched on 2 October 2025, to be used for general information, reporting dead fish or other animals, getting health advice and mental health support, and information about support packages.

On 9 September, SA Health issued updated public health advice, saying that people with asthma should carry medication when visiting beaches when foam is present. SA Health is also providing mental health support for those affected by the HAB.

The state and federal governments have provided A$28 million in funding to support research, clean-up efforts, community support, industry help, and public information.

A support package for small businesses affected by the HAB is being provided by the state government, which includes a one-off Algal Bloom Fisheries and Aquaculture Assistance Grant of up to A$100,000 as well as a A$10,000 Algal Bloom Small Business Support Grant, for smaller businesses or not-for-profits.

In August 2025, the state and federal governments provided funding of almost $700,000 to install a bubble curtain to protect the giant cuttlefish in the Upper Spencer Gulf during their breeding season, should the bloom move into that area. The curtain would protect approximately 50,000 to 80,000 eggs and hatchlings. The air-bubble curtain generator devised by SARDI would protect a small section of the cuttlefish breeding ground near Point Lowly from incursion of harmful algae. The 200 by 100 metres (660 ft × 330 ft) apparatus, driven by an on-shore compressor, was expected to provide a barrier, not as a remedy or cure, and would be energised when the breeding ground is threatened. A small proportion of the season's eggs would be protected, to become the new breeding colony when the water is safer.

On 3 October 2025, the state and federal governments announced a $1.4 million program to protect Australian sea lions, which are an endangered species of which 80 per cent live in South Australian waters.

An allocation $850,000 was pledged by the state government to fund the restoration of 15 oyster reefs around Yorke Peninsula, Eyre Peninsula, and Kangaroo Island over three years. Some of this funding is allocated to the creation of 25 additional sites as part of a reef restoration project started in 2023 by Eyre Lab director Manny Katz and University of Adelaide research fellow Dominic McAfee. Volunteers, including children, are assisting in the project.

The state government imposed temporary fishing restrictions several species from 1 November 2025, to allow their numbers to recover. The restrictions included a 50 per cent reduction in bag and boat limits for charter boat fishing in the Gulf St Vincent/Kangaroo Island Fishing Zone, and a 50 per cent reduction in bag and boat limits to squid, garfish, blue crab, and King George whiting in the Spencer Gulf Fishing Zone. There are also temporary restrictions on all commercial marine scalefish fishing and blue crab fishing in the Gulf St Vincent/Kangaroo Island Fishing Zone.

==== Summer plan and other support ====
Surf Life Saving beach patrols funded by state and federal governments are to be posted at eight beaches seven days a week all through the summer, showing safe places to swim between flags on the beach. A new Beachsafe app was launched on 12 October. Clean-up crews funded by the SA government will inspect around 23 coastal locations between North Haven to Goolwa daily. On 13 October, the state and federal governments launched the $15m "Coast is Calling – Dining Cashback program", which offers $50 to up to 300,000 people dining at beachside establishments. On 14 October, the SA Government announced a $16m support package for fishing and marine industries, offering grants of up to $275,000 to each eligible business. On the same day, the state and federal governments jointly announced their Algal Bloom Summer Plan, which includes $102.5 million in total to address the problem, which includes: $20.6 million towards environmental restoration; $17.3 million for monitoring and research; $48 million for businesses and communities along the coast; and another $16m to boost recreation and tourism at the coast.

At a forum on 29 January 2026, Environment Minister Lucy Hood said that around $48 million was being provided by government to support coastal communities and businesses, and additional resources had been deployed to the southern Yorke Peninsula, to clean up beaches and test the water twice weekly. The government was continuing to provide vouchers under its "Coast is Calling" travel scheme, of which around 4,500 had been used on the Yorke Peninsula, and around 6,000 dining cashback vouchers had been redeemed.

=== Government inquiries ===
==== Senate inquiry ====
A Senate inquiry was set up on 23 July 2025, led by Sarah Hanson-Young, with the Senate Standing Committees on Environment and Communications. It published its report on 11 November 2025. Western Australian senator Varun Ghosh and South Australian senator Karen Grogan were vice-chairs.

On the opening day of the inquiry, the committee heard that the state was unprepared for the disaster. It held public hearings in Adelaide, Port Lincoln, Ardrossan, and Victor Harbor. Kaurna Yerta Aboriginal Corporation, in its submission to the inquiry, said that the government's response had been "too slow" and it had not engaged enough directly with First Nations people.

The 207-page report identified the "limitations of existing research and monitoring programs", and included 14 recommendations, including that the federal government delineate specific responsibilities for all three levels of government. It said that the failures in monitoring and communications had led to significant delays, leaving South Australia poorly prepared to deal with the "ecological disaster".

==== South Australian Parliamentary inquiry ====
The Parliament of South Australia set up the "Joint Committee on Harmful Algal Blooms in South Australia" on 4 September 2025.

=== Community responses ===
==== Citizen science initiatives ====
Citizen science volunteer coordinator Samantha Sea giving a presentation on identification of dinoflagellate species in the algal bloom, 3 December 2025

=== Other suggestions ===
Donald Anderson, the director of the US National Office for Harmful Algal Blooms at the Woods Hole Oceanographic Institution, who was consulted by the state government, described a treatment involving a form of modified clay. The substance can be sprayed into the water, where it sticks to the algal cells, creating clumps called "floc", which fall and settle on the sea floor. While this treatment may be effective on a small scale, the quantities of clay needed would be impractical over the 4,500 km^{2} (1,700 mi^{2}) affected area.

The Australia Institute suggested that a National Climate Disaster Fund, paid for by levies on coal, oil, and gas production, would save taxpayers the billions that needs to be spent on mitigation of disasters caused by climate change, such as the South Australian HAB.

=== Criticism ===
On 16 March 2026, an ABC Four Corners investigation suggested that the SA Government had downplayed the harmful effects of the brevetoxins on people and animals' health, and that their delay in publishing health advice had "put asthmatics and those with compromised immune systems at risk". Following the airing of the show, Professor Ian Gibbins (who featured in the program) posted a lengthy commentary about it on the SA Surf and Bloom Facebook page, pointing out the complexities and unknowns regarding the effects of the bloom, that were not conveyed in government advice, nor by the program.

=== Government report ===
On 24 July 2026, SARDI published a report of the preliminary investigations, which gave the environmental triggers of the bloom as threefold: floodwaters, coastal upwelling, and the marine heatwave were all contributors to the event. Dated 15 May 2026, the "preliminary report" was released several months later, after being peer-reviewed.

== Ongoing activities and situation ==
Premier Peter Malinauskas and SA Environment Minister Lucy Hood continued to liaise with federal Environment Minister Murray Watt about a plan for managing the HAB through the summer. From early October, 94 coastal sites were being regularly monitored by the South Australian Research and Development Institute (SARDI). The bloom was not present in the northern Spencer Gulf, the giant cuttlefish breeding ground.

On 4 November 2025, SARDI reported in its weekly update that there was no Karenia detected at 14 out of 21 metropolitan onshore sites, and the rest recorded low levels. This had reduced considerably from 21 October, when six sites showed over a million cells of Karenia per litre.

Tests from the week beginning 28 December 2025 showed no or low levels of Karenia at 20 out of 21 metropolitan sites, although some swimmers and surfers were still reporting irritation. However, there were signs of increased activity of the bloom at the southwestern end of the Yorke Peninsula, and around Kangaroo Island, in particular Stokes Bay, with evidence of foaming and dead fish.

SARDI was continuing to monitor levels of the algae around the coast as of mid-January 2026.

On 1 February 2026, it was reported that the bloom was moving westwards with the sea currents, having mostly left Adelaide beaches, and was most active at the south-western tip of the Yorke Peninsula.

PIRSA provides regular reports of daily variations in chlorophyll-a (chla) concentrations, determined from satellite imagery, on its website. While this does not necessarily indicate the presence of Karenia species, they are an indicator of algae concentrations. The maps also indicate sea surface temperatures and the marine heatwave.

== Management ==
Marine ecologist Dominic McAfee, of the University of Adelaide, said that there is limited understanding on what impacts the HAB will have in both the short and long terms, and it is essential to first fill the gaps in knowledge in order to provide evidence-based management, monitoring, and an appropriate socio-economic response to recover from the event.
