= Karenia bicuneiformis =

Scientific classification
- Domain: Eukaryota
- Clade: Sar
- Clade: Alveolata
- Division: Dinoflagellata
- Class: Dinophyceae
- Order: Gymnodiniales
- Family: Kareniaceae
- Genus: Karenia
- Species: K. bicuneiformis

Binomial name
- Karenia bicuneiformis Botes et al.

Species of dinoflagellate

Karenia bicuneiformis, also known as Karenia bidigitata, is a microbial species from the genus Karenia, which are dinoflagellates. It was first discovered in New Zealand.

== Description ==
Common to the genus Karenia, this species shares morphological characters such as a smooth theca and a linear apical groove on its apex. At the same time, this species can be distinguished from its cogenerates on the basis of morphological characteristics within its vegetative cells, including the location and shape of its nucleus; the excavation of its hypotheca; the characteristics of its apical and sulcal groove extensions on the epitheca; the shape of its cells, as well as their size and symmetry; the degree of dorsoventral compression; and the presence of an apical carina.

Species that present said dorsoventral compression are shown to swim in a distinctive fluttering motion.

Molecular phylogenetic analyses of rDNA indicates Karenia bicuneiformis, together with K. selliformis and K. papilionacea, is closely related to K. mikimotoi and K. brevis.
