= Karenia selliformis =

Scientific classification
- Domain: Eukaryota
- Clade: Diaphoretickes
- Clade: SAR
- Clade: Alveolata
- Phylum: Myzozoa
- Superclass: Dinoflagellata
- Class: Dinophyceae
- Order: Gymnodiniales
- Family: Kareniaceae
- Genus: Karenia
- Species: K. selliformis

Binomial name
- Karenia selliformis Haywood et al.

Species of single-celled organism

Karenia selliformis is a species from the genus Karenia, which are dinoflagellates. It was first discovered in New Zealand. Karenia selliformis produces the highly toxic gymnodimine, and as such is a potentially harmful ocean dweller. Gymnodimine is a nicotinic acetylcholine receptor-blocking phycotoxin, a source of shellfish poisoning.

== Description ==
Common to the genus Karenia, this species shares morphological characters such as a smooth theca and a linear apical groove on its apex. At the same time, this species can be distinguished from its cogenerates on the basis of morphological characteristics within its vegetative cells, including the location and shape of its nucleus; the excavation of its hypotheca; the characteristics of its apical and sulcal groove extensions on the epitheca; the shape of its cells, as well as their size and symmetry; the degree of dorsoventral compression; and the presence of an apical carina.

Species that present said dorsoventral compression are shown to swim in a distinctive fluttering motion.

Molecular phylogenetic analyses of rDNA indicates Karenia selliformis, together with K. papilionacea and K. bicuneiformis, is closely related to K. mikimotoi and K. brevis.
