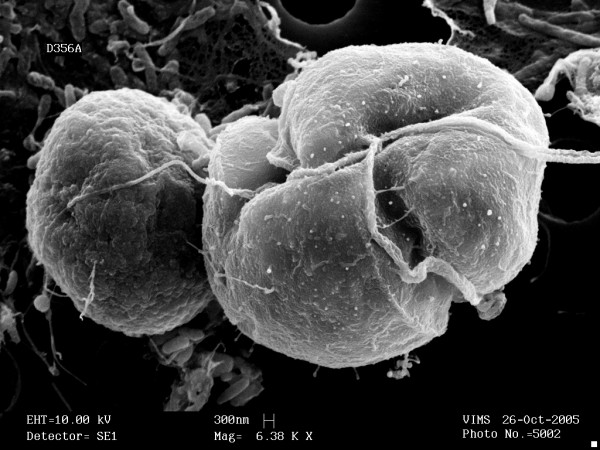
- Scanning electron microscope image of Karlodinium veneficum (right) feeding on Rhodomonas

Scientific classification
- Domain: Eukaryota
- Clade: Sar
- Clade: Alveolata
- Phylum: Dinoflagellata
- Class: Dinophyceae
- Order: Gymnodiniales
- Family: Kareniaceae
- Genus: Karlodinium
- Species: K. veneficum

Binomial name
- Karlodinium veneficum (D.Ballantine) J.Larsen 2000

= Karlodinium veneficum =

Species of single-celled organism

Karlodinium veneficum is a species of dinoflagellates belonging to the family Kareniaceae. This species is predominantly inhabiting aquatic environments, particularly in temperate coastal regions.

Karlodinium veneficum genome sizes have been reported as ~20 pg/cell and 4 pg/cell.

This phytoplankton has the capacity to produce harmful toxins, specifically karlotoxins, which have been associated with detrimental phenomena such as harmful algae blooms. These blooms have been documented globally, spanning regions from South Africa and Europe to Australia, North America, and China. The repercussions of K. veneficum blooms include not only ecological concerns, also substantial economic and environmental impacts.

The species-specific toxins produced by K. veneficum, known as karlotoxins, belong to the amphidinol-like compound class, exhibiting hemolytic, ichthyotoxic, and cytotoxic properties. The toxins generated by this dinoflagellate have been implicated in massive fish kills during bloom events.

K. veneficum is not confined to solitary blooms but frequently coexists with other phytoplankton species, such as Prorocentrum donghaiense and Karenia mikimotoi. K. veneficum often proliferates into dense blooms following the decline of P. donghaiense.
