= Gymnodimine =

Marine toxin

Names
- IUPAC name (2S)-2-[(1R,2E,11R,16S,17E,19S,22R,24R)-19-Hydroxy-2,15,18,24-tetramethyl-25-oxa-7-azatetracyclo[20.2.1.06,11.011,16]pentacosa-2,6,14,17-tetraen-14-yl]-4-methyl-2H-furan-5-one

Identifiers
| CAS Number | 173792-58-0 |
| 3D model (JSmol) | Interactive image |
| ChEBI | CHEBI:144404 |
| ChemSpider | 9823876 |
| KEGG | C20025 |
| PubChem CID | 11649137 |
| UNII | 7TV3J97IT8 |
| CompTox Dashboard (EPA) | DTXSID60880103 |
- InChI: InChI=1S/C32H45NO4/c1-19-8-6-9-29-32(13-7-15-33-29)14-12-25(28-18-22(4)31(35)37-28)23(5)26(32)17-20(2)27(34)11-10-24-16-21(3)30(19)36-24/h8,17-18,21,24,26-28,30,34H,6-7,9-16H2,1-5H3/b19-8+,20-17+/t21-,24-,26+,27+,28+,30+,32+/m1/s1
- SMILES: CC1CC2CCC(C(=CC3C(=C(CCC34CCCN=C4CCC=C(C1O2)C)C5C=C(C(=O)O5)C)C)C)O

Properties
| Chemical formula | C_{32}H_{45}NO_{4} |
| Molar mass | 507.715 g·mol^{−1} |
| Density | 1.2±0.1 g/cm^{3} |
| log P | 3.4 |
- Except where otherwise noted, data are given for materials in their standard state (at 25 °C [77 °F], 100 kPa). Infobox references

Gymnodimines are marine cyclic imine phycotoxins that are found in mollusks. They are highly potent neurotoxins that block nicotinic acetylcholine receptors, leading to disruption of neuromuscular signal transmission. They are structurally related to other cyclic imine toxins, like pinnatoxins and spirolides, and characterized by a macrocyclic structure containing a spirolinked imine group.

It was first discovered and isolated in 1994 from contaminated oysters in New Zealand during an algal bloom event. The compound was identified after an unexplained shellfish toxicity had occurred in the region. Gymnodimine structure was unique among other marine toxins featuring a cyclic imine moiety.

Initially identified as Gymnodinium cf. Mikimotoi, as it was thought to be associated with a different dinoflagellate. However, later studies confirmed that the toxins are produced by microalga planktonic dinoflagellates Karenia selliformis and Alexandrium ostenfeldii. Subsequently, gymnodimines were also detected in 2002 along the Tunisian coast, as well as in shellfish from Europe and North America.

Several structural analogues of the family of gymnodimine toxins have since been identified, including GYM-A, GYM-B, GYM-C and GYM-D. These analogues differ slightly in chemical structures, such as carbon chains but share their typical six-member cyclic imine ring that is central in determining their biological activity.

Gymnodimines can accumulate in filter-feeding shellfish, which can then be transferred to humans by the consumption of contaminated seafood.

== Structure, reactivity and synthesis ==
Gymnodimines are part of the marine toxins that have spirocyclic imines and with an ether or polyether subunit. It is a 6 membered spirocyclic imine and has lipophilic character. With the main interest of gymnodimines being the spirocyclic imine ring as its plays a role in the binding to nicotinic acetylcholine receptors. Several structural analogues of the family of gymnodimine toxins have since been identified, including GYM-A, GYM-B, GYM-C and GYM-D, all having slightly different side groups attached, with GYM-A being the most common variant and most researched one of the gymnodimines. About the reactivity there is not a lot known, but it can be assumed that because of its accumulation in shellfish it would be mainly unreactive. Due to GYM-A being a marine toxin, the synthesis of GYM-A was mainly done by enhancing the growth and GYM-A production in dinoflagellate, Karenia selliformis. Later, the retrosynthetic route of GYM-A was discovered and used as a synthesis pathway of GYM A for studying the mode of action of the marine toxin.

== Metabolism and biotransformation ==
Not a lot is known about the metabolism and biotransformation of GYM-A. GYM-A is accumulated in shellfish, indicating that GYM-A is not broken down rapidly in those organisms. However, a study in 2020 observed that there are two fatty acid metabolites of GYM-A in Mytilus galloprovincialis, which were exposed to Karenia selliformis.

== Molecular mechanism of action ==
The mechanism of GYM-A is related to its high affinity binding with nicotinic acetylcholine receptor (nAChR) subtypes in neuronal and neuromuscular synapses and is therefore a reversible high affinity inhibitor of this receptor. The potency of inhibition by GYM-A is dependent on the subtype of the nAChR. When GYM-A binds to the nAChRs the channel is blocked for activation by acetylcholine. As acetylcholine cannot bind to the receptor, the signal transduction from neuron to neuron junction or neuron to muscle cell junction will not take place. This is because there is no influx of ions, which normally happens when acetylcholine binds to the receptor. A paper published in 2008 discovered that GYM-A targets and binds with high affinity muscle- and neuronal-type nAChRs and thereby making it clear that GYM-A’s mechanism is by inactivation of those receptors. This similar as how other marine toxins of the group of cyclic imines act.

== Use and availability ==
=== Use ===
It has no approved medical or commercial use. It is, however, used as a research tool in toxicology because of its high affinity and low specificity for nicotinic acetylcholine receptors. Some studies indicate that gymnodimines could be used therapeutically to enhance anti-cancer effects of chemotherapeutic agents by sensitizing cells to apoptotic stimuli Neuro2a neuroblastoma cell line. Furthermore, it is suggested that gymnodimines could reduce beta-amyloid levels and tau phosphorylation contributing to neurodegenerative disease treatment.

=== Availability ===
Gymnodimines naturally occur in marine environments during algal blooms. As it is isolated from dinoflagellates, shellfish and coastal waters during algal blooms and is reported in New Zealand, Tunisia, United States and Europe. For example, these toxins accumulate in the digestive gland of Tunisian clams, some amounts can also be found in the meat. It is thought to remain in the ecosystems for a long period of time, as the toxins have shown a slow depuration rate in oysters. As mentioned in the part about synthesis, it is also synthetically produced in laboratories. No regulations have been established for gymnodimine toxins.

== Efficacy and side effects ==
=== Efficacy ===
Gymnodimines are highly potent neurotoxins that block nicotinic acetylcholine receptors. Less toxic when introduced by force-feeding or when consumed with food. Gymnodimine B is 10-fold less toxic than Gymnodimine A to mice. GYM-A was shown to make neurons more sensitive to apoptosis by okadic acid. In addition to mice, it also demonstrated toxicity against freshwater fish Tanichthys albonubes (0.1 ppm at pH 8).

LD_{50} mice: intraperitoneal administration 80-96 microg/kg.

LD_{50} mice: subcutaneously 100 micrograms/kg.

LD_{50} mice: oral administration 755 ug/kg.

LD_{50} mice GYM-B: intraperitoneal 800 micrograms/kg.

=== Side effects ===
Studies done on mice showed rapid onset toxicity, starting with hyperactivity. Then flattening and paralysis of the hind legs happens, and lastly respiratory problems occur with finally death after 3 minutes of injection. So, the poisoning effects are: muscle paralysis, neuromuscular blockade, and respiratory distress. Harmful effects in individuals consuming contaminated shellfish were absent. No long-term exposure effects to subacute doses have been investigated in humans.
