= Karlodinium ballantinum =

Scientific classification
- Domain: Eukaryota
- Clade: Diaphoretickes
- Clade: SAR
- Clade: Alveolata
- Phylum: Myzozoa
- Superclass: Dinoflagellata
- Class: Dinophyceae
- Order: Gymnodiniales
- Family: Kareniaceae
- Genus: Karlodinium
- Species: K. ballantinum

Binomial name
- Karlodinium ballantinum de Salas

Species of single-celled organism

Karlodinium ballantinum is a species of unarmored dinoflagellates from the genus Karlodinium. It was first isolated from the Australian region of the Southern Ocean. It is small-sized and is characterized by its very short apical groove. It is considered potentially ichthyotoxic.
