= Karlodinium decipiens =

Scientific classification
- Domain: Eukaryota
- Clade: Diaphoretickes
- Clade: SAR
- Clade: Alveolata
- Phylum: Myzozoa
- Superclass: Dinoflagellata
- Class: Dinophyceae
- Order: Gymnodiniales
- Family: Kareniaceae
- Genus: Karlodinium
- Species: K. decipiens

Binomial name
- Karlodinium decipiens Salas & Laza-Martinez

Species of single-celled organism

Karlodinium decipiens is a species of unarmored dinoflagellates from the genus Karlodinium. It was first isolated from the Australian region of the Southern Ocean, but has a widespread distribution, through the Southern Ocean to the Tasman Sea, to the coast of Spain. It is large-sized and is characterized by having a helicoidal chloroplast arrangement and a big central nucleus. It is considered potentially ichthyotoxic.
