= Karlodinium antarcticum =

Scientific classification
- Domain: Eukaryota
- Clade: Diaphoretickes
- Clade: SAR
- Clade: Alveolata
- Phylum: Myzozoa
- Superclass: Dinoflagellata
- Class: Dinophyceae
- Order: Gymnodiniales
- Family: Kareniaceae
- Genus: Karlodinium
- Species: K. antarcticum

Binomial name
- Karlodinium antarcticum de Salas

Species of single-celled organism

Karlodinium antarcticum is a species of unarmored dinoflagellates from the genus Karlodinium. It was first isolated from the Australian region of the Southern Ocean, near the polar front. It is medium-sized and is characterized by its long ovoid cell shape and rather long apical groove. It is considered potentially ichthyotoxic.
