= Karlodinium conicum =

Scientific classification
- Domain: Eukaryota
- Clade: Diaphoretickes
- Clade: SAR
- Clade: Alveolata
- Phylum: Myzozoa
- Superclass: Dinoflagellata
- Class: Dinophyceae
- Order: Gymnodiniales
- Family: Kareniaceae
- Genus: Karlodinium
- Species: K. conicum

Binomial name
- Karlodinium conicum de Salas

Species of single-celled organism

Karlodinium conicum is a species of unarmored dinoflagellates from the genus Karlodinium. It was first isolated from the Australian region of the Southern Ocean. It is large-sized and is characterized by having a distinct conical epicone and spherical posterior nucleus, hence its name. It is considered potentially ichthyotoxic.
