= Great South Australian Coastal Upwelling System =

Seasonal upwelling system in the eastern Great Australian Bight

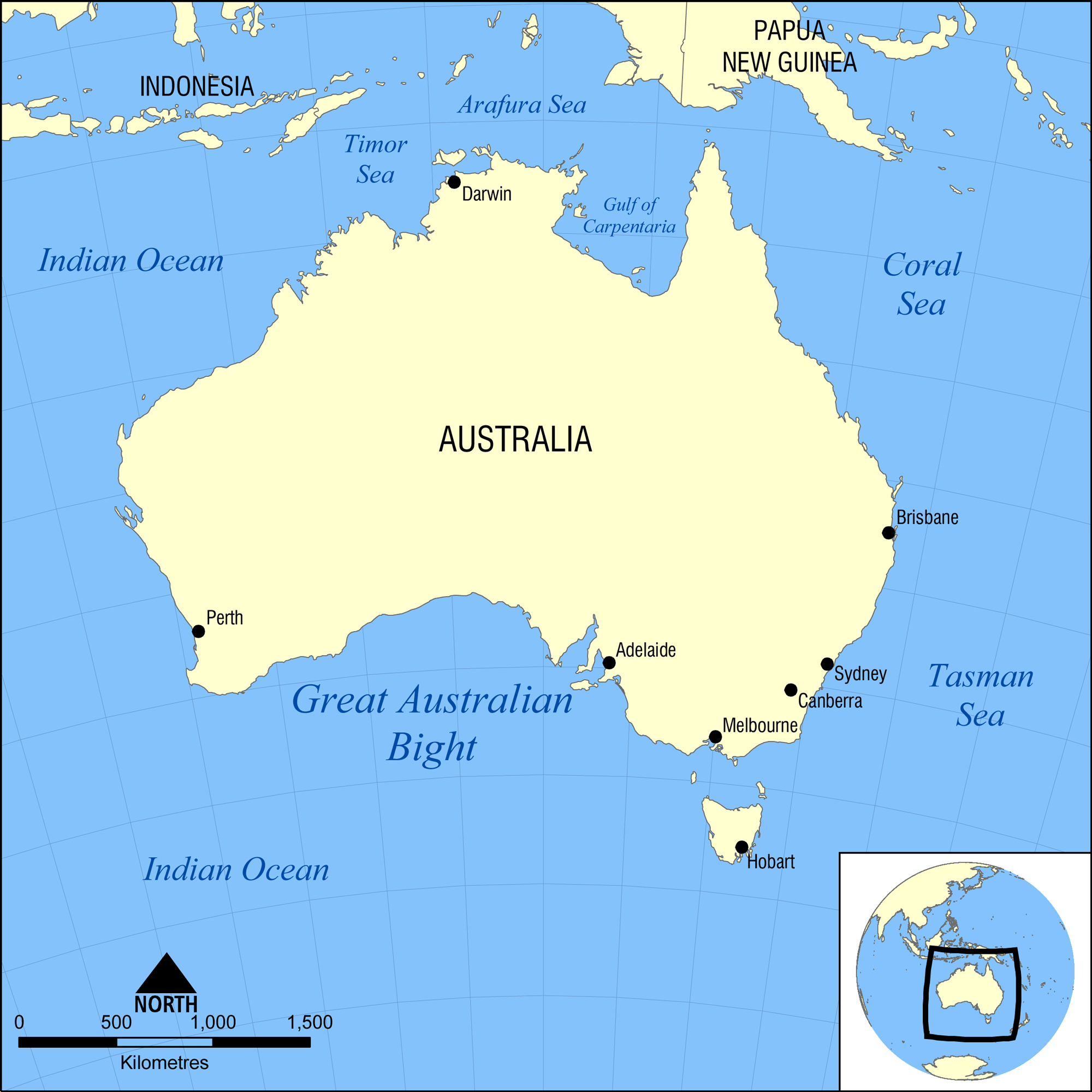
Map of Australia, showing the Great Australian Bight.

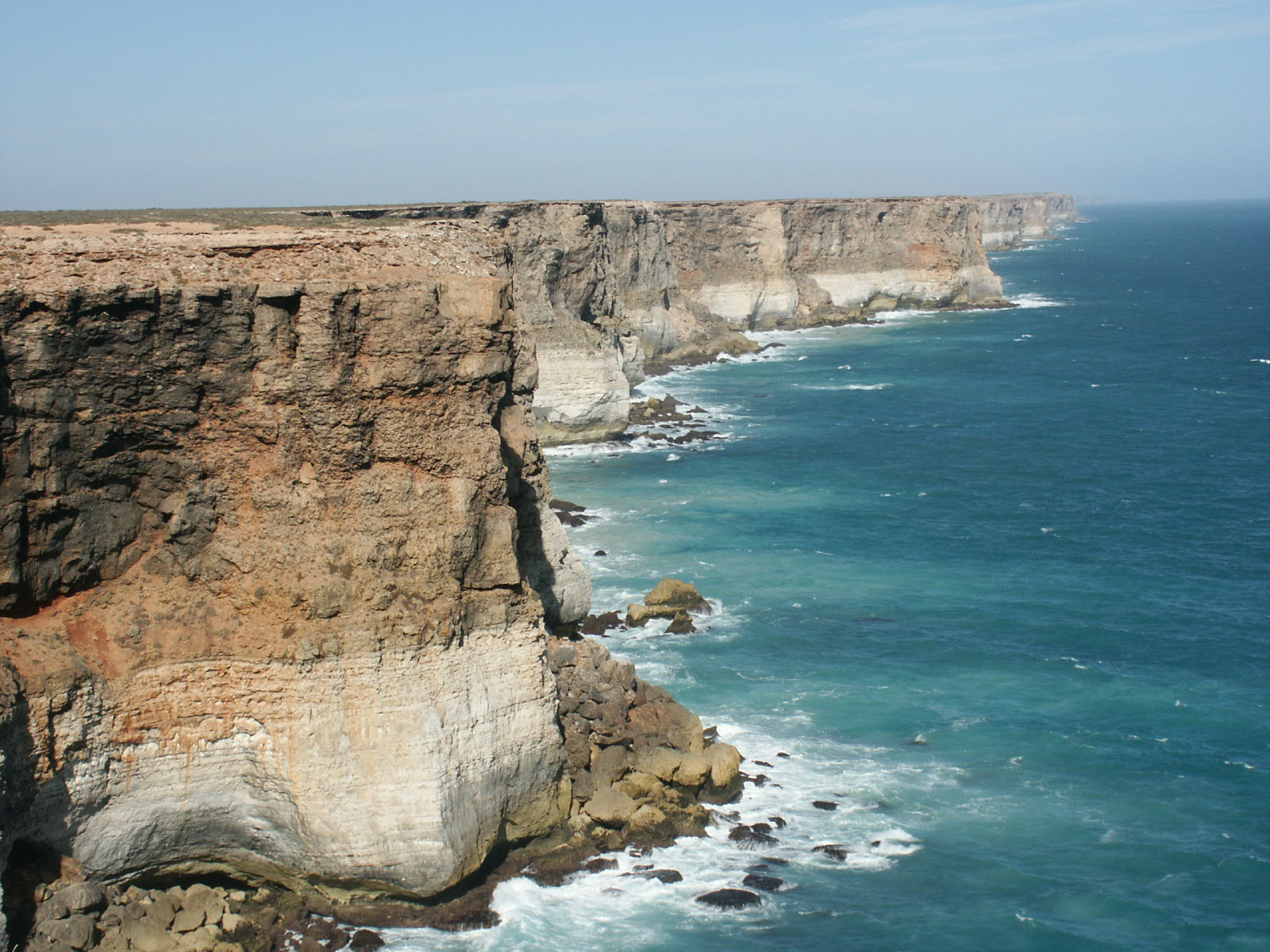
Great Australian Bight

The Great South Australian Coastal Upwelling System is a seasonal upwelling system in the eastern Great Australian Bight, extending from Ceduna, South Australia, to Portland, Victoria, over a distance of about 800 kilometres (500 mi). Upwelling events occur in the austral summer (from November to May) when seasonal winds blow from the southeast. These winds blow parallel to the shoreline at certain areas of the coast, which forces coastal waters offshore via Ekman transport and draws up cold, nutrient-rich waters from the ocean floor.

Because the deep water carries abundant nutrients up from the ocean floor, the upwelling area differs from the rest of the Great Australian Bight, especially the areas offshore of Western Australia and the Nullarbor Plain in South Australia, which are generally nutrient-poor. Every summer, the upwelling sustains a bountiful ecosystem that attracts blue whales and supports rich fisheries.

The Great South Australian Coastal Upwelling System (GSACUS) is Australia's only deep-reaching coastal upwelling system, with nutrient-enriched water stemming from depths exceeding 300 metres (980 ft).

Recently, a new upwelling centre has been discovered on the western shelf of Tasmania. Since this new upwelling centre is located outside South Australian waters, the entire upwelling system should be called the Great Southern Australian Coastal Upwelling System.

== Oceanographic processes ==
During the austral summer, high-pressure systems over the Great Australian Bight cause southeasterly winds to blow over the coasts of Victoria and South Australia. When winds blow parallel to the shoreline, Ekman transport pushes water to the left of the wind direction (in the southern hemisphere), which in this case is westward and offshore. To replace the water moving offshore, cold waters from the ocean floor rise to the surface. During upwelling events, local sea surface temperature drops by 2-3 degrees Celsius.

Key upwelling centres form in three different locations, described in the sub-sections below; the Kangaroo Island and Eyre Peninsula centres are linked by the same upwelling process. Upwelling events occur nearly simultaneously across the three separate centres, appearing within a few days of each other, despite spanning a distance of approximately 800 kilometres (500 mi). While the Bonney Upwelling, where the strongest and most reliable upwelling events occur, was reported and explored over 30 years ago, the full extent of the upwelling system was discovered only as recently as 2004.

=== Bonney Upwelling ===
The Bonney Upwelling is the largest and most predictable upwelling in the GSACUS. It stretches from Portland, Victoria to Robe, South Australia. The continental shelf is narrow offshore of the "Bonney Coast" - only about 20 kilometres (12 mi) from the shore to the continental slope - and deep water is funneled to the surface through a series of submarine canyons.

=== Kangaroo Island and Eyre Peninsula ===
Upwelling at Kangaroo Island and the Eyre Peninsula is different than at the Bonney Upwelling. Here, the continental shelf is generally much wider than at the Bonney Coast - up to 100 kilometres (62 mi) wide off the Eyre Peninsula - and water is not drawn directly from the seafloor to the surface. Instead, field data and hydrodynamic modelling suggest that the upwelling follows from a chain of processes. This chain of processes starts in the deep submarine canyons of the Murray Canyon Group, located south of Kangaroo Island, where localized sub-surface upwelling brings a pool of cold water from the abyssal plains up to the continental shelf. This dense-water pool, named the Kangaroo Island Pool, drifts along the shelf bottom just offshore of Kangaroo Island and the Eyre Peninsula. When a classical wind-driven upwelling event occurs, normally two to three times a summer, cold water is upwelled from the pool, not directly from the ocean floor.

== Ecology ==
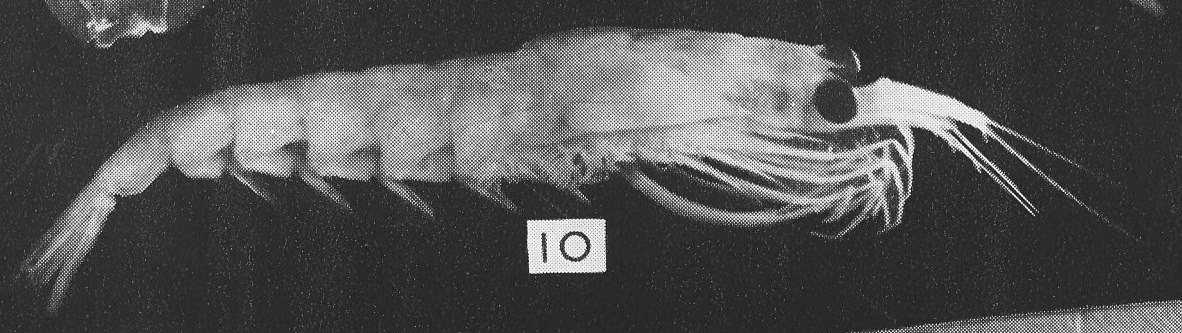
Large swarms of krill, Nyctiphanes australis, form during upwelling events.

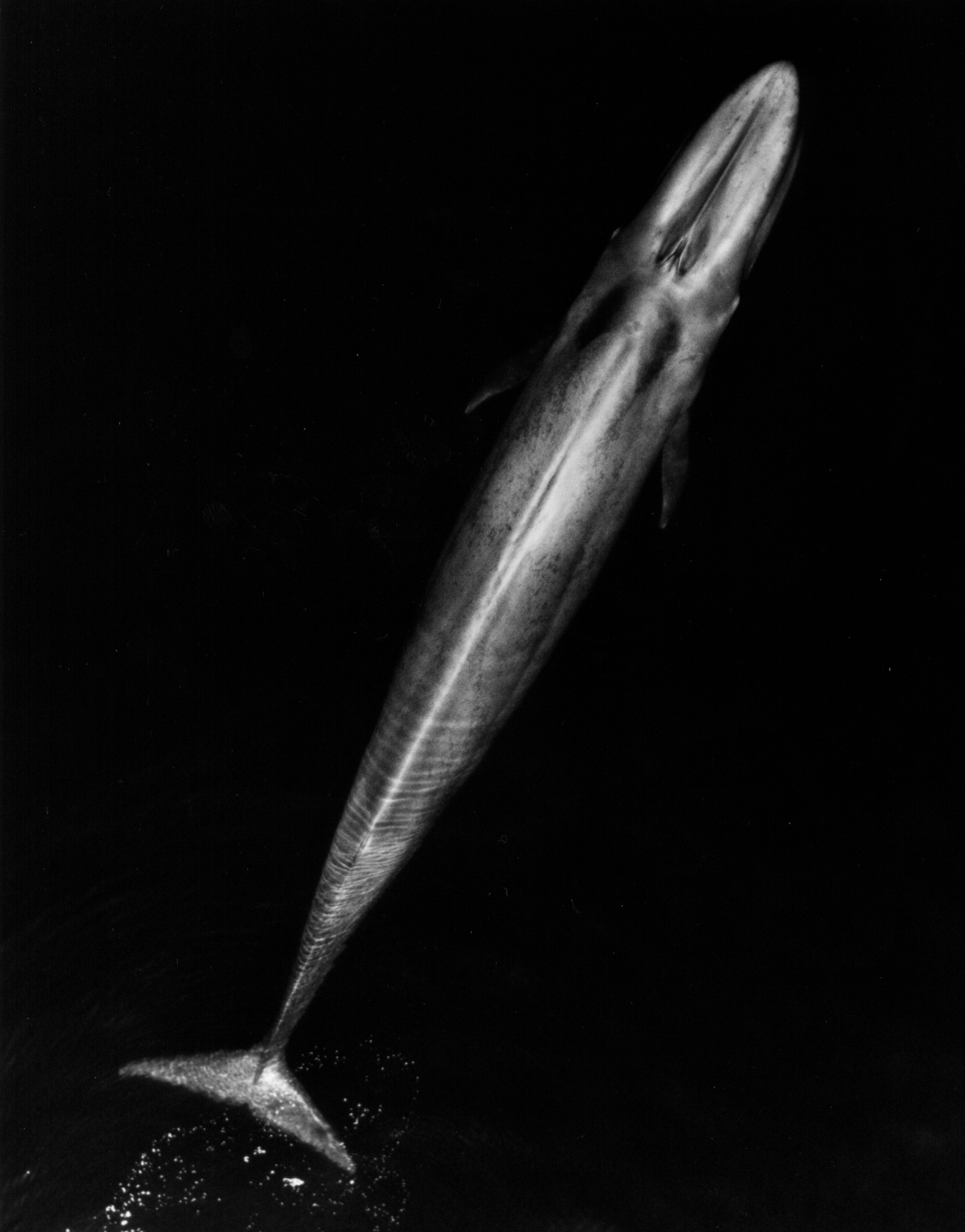
An abundance of krill makes the Bonney Upwelling an important feeding site for the blue whale (Balaenoptera musculus).

Extensive upwelling of nutrient-rich water makes the GSACUS an important marine hot spot on Australia's southern shelves. During upwelling events, the abundance of the GSACUS ecosystem can approach that of some of the world’s most productive upwelling centers, such as those offshore of Peru, California, and Namibia.

During upwelling events, surface chlorophyll a concentrations, an indicator of phytoplankton abundance, increase tenfold. Phytoplankton blooms bring about swarms of krill, which in turn attract blue whales. Blue whales are found in various locations off the southeast coast of Australia, but most predominantly in the Bonney Upwelling region, which is one of 12 identified blue whale feeding sites worldwide. Marine biologist Peter Gill estimates that 100 blue whales visit the Bonney Upwelling area every year, ranging over 18,000 square kilometres (6,900 sq mi) of ocean from Robe, South Australia to Cape Otway in Victoria. The feeding grounds may extend further northwest, encompassing the rest of the GSACUS, but incomplete whale surveys are insufficient to establish their true range.

Other marine life that thrives in the upwelling includes filter feeders like sponges, bryozoans, and corals. These animals feed predators such as seabirds, fishes, Australian fur seals, and penguins. The upwelling plays also an important role in the life cycle of juvenile southern bluefin tuna (Thunnus maccoyii), which accumulate in the eastern Great Australian Bight during the upwelling season and feed on sardines (Sardinops sagax) and anchovies (Engraulis australis). Furthermore, the many dead organisms that fall to the continental shelf support populations of southern rock lobster and giant crab.

=== Economic importance ===
The GSACUS supports a productive fishery, and local fishers recognize the bounty that the upwelling provides them. Every November, Portland, Victoria, hosts an Upwelling Festival to celebrate the abundance of the Bonney Upwelling, and to begin the summer fishing season.

Humans have exploited the GSACUS for thousands of years. Oral histories of local Aboriginal tribes indicate a close connection to the ocean, and said tribes may possibly have eaten beached whales. The Convincing Ground massacre, which took place near Portland, Victoria in 1829, arose over a dispute between European whalers and the Gunditjmara people over ownership of a beached whale. Beginning in the mid-1840s, whaling and sealing were established as organized industries off the Bonney Coast.

Today, southern rock lobster (referred to locally as crayfish) and trawling are the most important fishing industries in the Bonney Upwelling. whereas the upwelling off the Eyre Peninsula supports a large sardine fishery, operating chiefly out of Port Lincoln, South Australia.

=== Harmful algal blooms ===
The 2025 algal bloom in South Australia, attributed to an upwelling event in 2023-2024 coinciding with a 2.5 °C (4.5 °F) marine heatwave, impacted local fisheries, aquaculture and tourism industries.

However, the IMOS Sea Surface Temperature Charts and the Bureau of Meteorology SST Anomaly Charts (both readily accessible on their respective websites) show quite clearly that the Bonney Upwelling was both late and highly attenuated compared to usual in the months leading up to and during the early stages of the HAB. It did not appear until 4 February 2025, pulsed weakly during that month, then more so during March before disappearing around April 10 2025. Over this time the Upwelling barely extended north of Cape Jaffa, well away from the Southern Coast of Fleurieu Peninsula where the HAB arrived on the beaches in mid March. This suggests that if the Bonney Upwelling contributed to the HAB it would be by its weakness and absence rather than its strength and presence over the summer of 2024 / 2025.

== Conservation ==
Next to the Great Barrier Reef, the GSACUS and its ecosystem can be regarded as one of Australia's natural wonders. Due to its importance as a blue whale feeding and aggregation site, in 2002 the Bonney Upwelling was listed as critical habitat "requiring effective protection from user impacts" under Australia's Environment Protection and Biodiversity Conservation Act 1999. In addition to the blue whale, one species of shark is listed as critically endangered, and five bird and two whale species are listed as endangered.

Significant reserves of natural gas are present beneath the Bonney Coast, and are undergoing exploration. Fears have been expressed that expanded gas drilling may threaten whales through noise pollution and ship collisions.

== See also ==
- Upwelling
- Blue whale
