= Karlodinium armiger =

Scientific classification
- Domain: Eukaryota
- Clade: Diaphoretickes
- Clade: SAR
- Clade: Alveolata
- Phylum: Myzozoa
- Superclass: Dinoflagellata
- Class: Dinophyceae
- Order: Gymnodiniales
- Family: Kareniaceae
- Genus: Karlodinium
- Species: K. armiger

Binomial name
- Karlodinium armiger Bergholtz, Daugbjerg & Moestrup

Species of single-celled organism

Karlodinium armiger is a species of dinoflagellates belonging to the family Kareniaceae. It was first isolated from the Mediterranean sea & described in 2006.

It is a producer of karmitoxin, a toxin structurally related to amphidinols and karlotoxins; however karmitoxin also contains the longest carbon−carbon backbone known for this compound class, and an unusual primary amino group.

It has a spherical shape with a diameter of about 15 μm. Under optimal conditions with supplemented NH4^{+}, it has a division rate of ~0.3 times per day.
