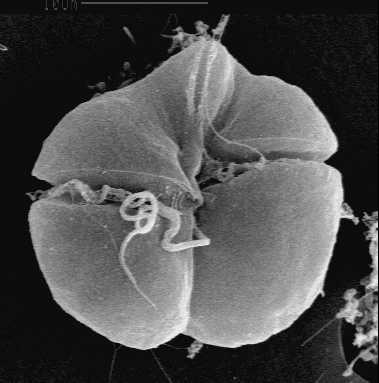
- Karenia brevis

Scientific classification
- Domain: Eukaryota
- Clade: Sar
- Clade: Alveolata
- Phylum: Dinoflagellata
- Class: Dinophyceae
- Order: Gymnodiniales
- Family: Kareniaceae
- Genus: Karenia; Gert Hansen & Moestrup

Type species
- Karenia brevis (C.C.Davis) Gert Hansen & Moestrup

= Karenia (dinoflagellate) =

Genus of single-celled organisms

Karenia is a genus that consists of unicellular, photosynthetic, planktonic organisms found in marine environments. The genus currently consists of 12 described species. They are best known for their dense toxic algal blooms and red tides that cause considerable ecological and economical damage; some Karenia species cause severe animal mortality. Two species, Karenia brevis and Karenia cristata, are known to cause respiratory distress and neurotoxic shellfish poisoning (NSP) in humans.

== Taxonomy ==
The genus Karenia is named for Dr. Karen Steidinger for her exceptional contributions to dinoflagellate research. She has spent many decades researching Karenia brevis.

12 species have been described in the genus Karenia thus far:

- Karenia asterichroma
- Karenia bicuneiformis
- Karenia brevis
- Karenia brevisulcata
- Karenia concordia
- Karenia cristata
- Karenia digitata
- Karenia longicanalis
- Karenia mikimotoi
- Karenia papilionacea
- Karenia selliformis
- Karenia umbella

== History of knowledge ==
Characteristic fish killings described by 15th and 16th century Spanish explorers were likely the earliest recorded sightings of Karenia. Other major fish killings were documented in 1844 off of the coast of Florida. Oda, in 1935, was the first to name any species in what is now the genus Karenia: Gymnodinium mikimotoi but was later renamed Karenia mikimotoi. Davis in 1948 was the first to document that the cause of the fish kills was the dinoflagellate Gymnodinium breve, which was renamed Ptychodiscus brevis and since 2001 is now known as Karenia brevis.

== Description ==
Karenia are naked, flat, unicellular, photosynthetic cells that are quite pleomorphic: size tends to range from about 20–90 um. The cell contains a straight apical groove, and differences in apical grooves (acrobases) are often used to distinguish between species. Thecal plates are not present. The cell body can be divided into an episome and a hyposome like other dinoflagellates. Two dissimilar flagella that are involved in locomotion are present in the cingulum and sulcus. The cytoplasm contains many yellow-green chloroplasts. The plastid of Karenia is especially notable as it is the product of tertiary endosymbiosis, by uptake of a haptophyte. Therefore, they lack the typical dinoflagellate pigment peridinin and have a plastid with pigments chlorophylls a+c and 19′-hexanoyloxyfucoxanthin, typically haptophyte pigments. A nucleus is also found in the cell and its location and shape can distinguish between species.

== Habitat and ecology ==
Karenia is found throughout the world in both oceanic and coastal waters. It is relatively sporadic in abundance, but it can form large blooms in the summer or fall which can have severe ecological and economical consequences. These blooms are generally referred to as harmful algal blooms (HABs), but are also sometimes referred to as red tides. Karenia is known to divide very slowly, but are able to form dense blooms probably due to their ability to swim quickly, which likely allows them access to higher concentrations of nutrients. Many of these blooms consist of more than one type of Karenia species. The cause of the blooms is still poorly understood.

When a large bloom occurs, resources become limited, and this means greater competition for space and sunlight between several marine organisms—as the genus Karenia start dying they release their neurotoxins, which can kill fish and other organisms. The dense blooms can also cause animal mortalities through anoxia. Karenia brevis also causes distress in humans in the form of neurotoxic shellfish poisoning (NSP) which gets biomagnified up the food chain. Karenia species produce a variety of toxins, with many probably producing more than one.

Karenia are considered autotrophic organisms primarily, but some have been found to be mixotrophic as they can ingest microbes as well.

Microbes have also been seen to be capable of attacking Karenia species, although their role in population dynamics is not well understood.

== Biology ==
=== Life cycle ===
Although the genus Karenia consists of 12 described species, most research on life cycles has been done on Karenia brevis which will be outlined here. Karenia follow the typical life cycle of a dinoflagellate with a motile, haploid, asexual cell with regular mitotic divisions. This binary fission reproduction occurs once about every 2–10 days, and division occurs primarily at night (Brand et al., 2012). They occasionally produce diploid planozygotes (mobile zygotes) implying they are capable of sexual reproduction. They have been observed to be in what appears to be the process of conjugation, a type of unicellular sexual reproduction. They can enter a hypnozygote cyst stage, which is an often thick walled, resting cyst that results from sexual fusion. This occurs when environmental conditions are adverse and allows it to be dormant and spread to grow algal blooms elsewhere.

=== Genetics ===
Karenia, like all organisms in the dinoflagellate group, are characteristic for their unique permanently condensed chromatin that lacks nucleosomes and histones. The less tightly packed loops of DNA consist of actively transcribed DNA. The haploid genome is large (about 30 times the size of humans), and usually contain a large quantity of repetitive, non-coding DNA. They also portray a unique mitosis where the nuclear envelope stays intact and the mitotic spindle has extra nuclear microtubules that go through the nucleus through cytoplasmic channels.

The genome of Karenia brevis is estimated to be about 1×10^{11} bp, although the genome has not been sequenced in any members of this genus.

== Toxicity ==
Karenia are well known for their toxic blooms that kill fish, marine organisms, and other animals. These blooms, also called red tides, cause extensive ecological and economic damage. What causes these harmful algal blooms is still poorly understood.

Karenia brevis is of particular importance to humans because it also can cause neurotoxic shellfish poisoning (NSP) and respiratory distress through accumulation of toxins in tissue. These toxins are taken up by molluscs with no detrimental effects, but they distress the humans who ingest the molluscs. The distress is caused by neurotoxins called brevetoxins. Brevetoxins are lipid soluble and capable of biomagnification up the food chain. They work by activating voltage-sensitive sodium channels and causing them to remain open for excessive amounts of time, which leads to uncontrolled depolarization of the neural membrane. This results in persistent neuron firing. No deaths have been recorded in association with brevetoxin, but severe effects have been noted, such as nausea, vomiting, and slurred speech.

Karenia cristata, about which little is known, is also a source of brevetoxins, and was found to be one of five species present in the 2025 algal bloom in South Australia which caused respiratory symptoms in some people.
