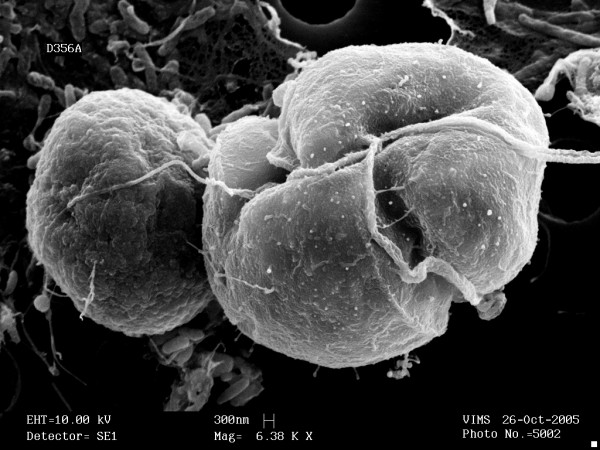
- Karlodinium veneficum

Scientific classification
- Domain: Eukaryota
- Clade: Sar
- Clade: Alveolata
- Phylum: Dinoflagellata
- Class: Dinophyceae
- Order: Gymnodiniales
- Family: Kareniaceae
- Genus: Karlodinium; J.Larsen

Species
- See text

= Karlodinium =

Genus of single-celled organisms

Karlodinium is a genus of athecate dinoflagellates that lives worldwide. They are often toxin producing, and compared to the other members of the Kareniaceae, are fairly small at <8-15 μm diameter. They are also able to form intense algal blooms. This species relies of photosynthesis and phagotrophy to grow.

== Species ==
- Karlodinium antarcticum
- Karlodinium armiger
- Karlodinium ballantinum
- Karlodinium conicum
- Karlodinium corrugatum
- Karlodinium decipiens
- Karlodinium veneficum
