= Karmitoxin =

Names
- IUPAC name (2E,4E,8E,22E,26S,27R,28S,29R,33R,34R,35R)-1-amino-36-((2R,3S,4R,5S,6R)-6-((5R,6R)-6-((2S,4S,5S,6S)-6-((1R,2R,3E,15E)-1,2-dihydroxyoctadeca-3,15,17-trien-1-yl)-4,5-dihydroxytetrahydro-2H-pyran-2-yl)-1,5,6-trihydroxy-4-methylenehexyl)-3,4,5-trihydroxytetrahydro-2H-pyran-2-yl)-6,12,16,20,24,27,28,29,34,35-decahydroxy-26,33-dimethylhexatriaconta-2,4,8,22-tetraen-14-one

Identifiers
3D model (JSmol)	Interactive image
ChemSpider	61708674
PubChem CID	163112076
- InChI: InChI=1S/C73H127NO23/c1-5-6-7-8-9-10-11-12-13-14-15-16-17-23-36-56(82)66(90)73-67(91)59(85)45-60(97-73)68(92)63(87)47(3)38-39-57(83)72-71(95)70(94)69(93)61(96-72)44-58(84)62(86)46(2)28-25-37-55(81)65(89)64(88)48(4)41-51(77)34-26-32-50(76)33-27-35-53(79)43-54(80)42-52(78)31-21-18-20-29-49(75)30-22-19-24-40-74/h5-7,18-20,22-24,26,30,34,36,46,48-53,55-73,75-79,81-95H,1,3,8-17,21,25,27-29,31-33,35,37-45,74H2,2,4H3/b7-6+,20-18+,24-19+,30-22+,34-26+,36-23+/t46-,48+,49?,50?,51?,52?,53?,55-,56-,57?,58-,59+,60+,61-,62-,63-,64-,65+,66-,67+,68+,69-,70-,71+,72-,73-/m1/s1 Key: OWONYFGWIVVTML-QNVGQBNPSA-N
- SMILES: NC/C=C/C=C/C(C/C=C/CCC(CC(CC(CCCC(C/C=C/C(C[C@@H]([C@@H](O)[C@@H](O)[C@@H](CCC[C@@H](C)[C@@H](O)[C@@H](C[C@]1([H])[C@@H](O)[C@@H](O)[C@H](O)[C@](C(CCC([C@H]([C@H]([C@]2([H])C[C@H](O)[C@H](O)[C@@]([H])([C@H](O)[C@@H](/C=C/CCCCCCCCCC/C=C/C=C)O)O2)O)O)=C)O)([H])O1)O)O)C)O)O)O)=O)O)O

Properties
Chemical formula	C_{73}H_{127}NO_{23}
Molar mass	1386.803 g·mol^{−1}
- Except where otherwise noted, data are given for materials in their standard state (at 25 °C [77 °F], 100 kPa). Infobox references

Karmitoxin is an amine-containing polyhydroxy-polyene toxin isolated from Karlodinium armiger strain K-0668. It is structurally related to amphidinols, luteophanols, lingshuiols, carteraols, and karlotoxins.

== See also ==
- Prymnesin-1
- Prymnesin-2
