= Alexandrium ostenfeldii =

Scientific classification
- Domain: Eukaryota
- Clade: Diaphoretickes
- Clade: SAR
- Clade: Alveolata
- Phylum: Myzozoa
- Superclass: Dinoflagellata
- Class: Dinophyceae
- Order: Gonyaulacales
- Family: Ostreopsidaceae
- Genus: Alexandrium
- Species: A. ostenfeldii

Binomial name
- Alexandrium ostenfeldii (Paulsen) Balech & Tangen

Species of single-celled organism

Alexandrium ostenfeldii, also known as the sea fire, is a species of dinoflagellates. It is among the group of Alexandrium species that produce toxins causing paralytic shellfish poisoning. These organisms have been found in the Baltic Sea.
