= Karenia mikimotoi =

Scientific classification
- Domain: Eukaryota
- Supergroup: Alveolata
- Division: Dinoflagellata
- Class: Dinophyceae
- Order: Gymnodiniales
- Family: Kareniaceae
- Genus: Karenia
- Species: K. mikimotoi

Binomial name
- Karenia mikimotoi (Miyake & Kominami ex Oda) Gert Hansen & Ø.Moestrup

Species of dinoflagellate

Karenia mikimotoi is a dinoflagellate species from the genus Karenia that can cause a harmful algal bloom. Its first appearance was in Japan in 1935 and since then, it has appeared in other parts of the world such as the east coast of the United States, Norway, the English Channel, and southern Australia.

== Description ==
Karenia mikimotoi has yellow-brown chloroplasts and, like other species in its genus, is able to activate photosynthetically. It lacks thecal plates, and is more ovular.

Blooms usually form during warmer months.

The toxicity of Karenia mikimotoi is not fully understood, whereas other species in Karenia have identified toxins that are shown to kill marine life. For example, Karenia brevis has brevetoxins. It is believed that its killing effects are due to a combination of the creation of an anoxic environment by the physical bloom itself in addition to some sort of toxin.

New toxins called gymnocin A and B were discovered in 2005, but their low toxicity is inconsistent with the high number of deaths Karenia mikimotoi causes. It is believed that in red tides, Karenia mikimotoi fills in the fish's gills, thereby allowing direct contact with toxins. This is a more likely approach to the toxin's mechanisms.

== Major appearances ==
=== Ireland and the UK ===
In August, 1978, a bloom stretched 100 km (62 mi) eastwards in Roaringwater Bay from Fastnet Rock to Kinsale Harbor in Irish waters. The next year at around the same time, a similar bloom appeared, and again in 1984. These blooms resulted in the deaths of benthic organisms as well as farmed culture and their consistency suggests the water zone between the upwelling open ocean and the more stratified inner bay might be favorable conditions for phytoplankton growth.

The English Channel experienced a major bloom in 2003 that traveled from the western English Channel at end of June to the French coast of Brittany at the beginning of August. The density of this bloom was up to 100 mg/m^{3} whereas it usually only takes 10 mg/m^{3} to cause noticeable discoloration.

In 2005, a major bloom appeared off the west coast of Ireland. Deaths due to the bloom persisted throughout that entire summer. In August, deaths were still being reported. There were reports of dead lugworms and cockles washing up on beaches, as well as unoxygenated sediment beginning to appear due to eliminations in other parts of the ecosystem.

In a May 2022 an announcement from DEFRA, the UK Government department responsible for environmental protection, blamed mass deaths of crabs and lobsters along the coast of north-east England between October 2021 and February 2022 on blooms of Karenia mikimotoi, but this is disputed by local commercial fisheries, who point out that blooms are unlikely as the water temperature, at 13 °C, is too cold. Instead, it is speculated that the polluting chemical pyridine was responsible.

=== Australia ===
In March 2025, a marine heatwave-induced bloom of Karenia mikimotoi was blamed for the deaths of thousands of marine creatures, as well as coughing, sore eyes, and blurry vision in humans, along stretches of beach along the south coast of the Fleurieu Peninsula in South Australia. Despite hopes that winter storms would cause the bloom to dissipate, relatively mild conditions caused it to persist and spread along adjacent coasts of Kangaroo Island and Gulf St Vincent (including Adelaide's metropolitan beaches) and into the Coorong.

A Senate inquiry was set up on 23 July 2025, with the Senate Standing Committees on Environment and Communications due to publish its report on 28 October 2025.
