= Prorocentrum donghaiense =

Scientific classification
- Domain: Eukaryota
- Clade: Sar
- Clade: Alveolata
- Phylum: Dinoflagellata
- Class: Dinophyceae
- Order: Prorocentrales
- Family: Prorocentraceae
- Genus: Prorocentrum
- Species: P. donghaiense

Binomial name
- Prorocentrum donghaiense Lu & Goebel 2001

Species of single-celled organism

Prorocentrum donghaiense is a species of bloom-forming species of planktonic dinoflagellates.
