= Brevetoxin =

Class of chemical compounds produced naturally

Brevetoxin (PbTx), or brevetoxins, are a suite of cyclic polyether compounds produced naturally by a species of dinoflagellate known as Karenia brevis. Brevetoxins are neurotoxins that bind to voltage-gated sodium channels in nerve cells, leading to disruption of normal neurological processes and causing the illness clinically described as neurotoxic shellfish poisoning (NSP). Although brevetoxins are most well-studied in K. brevis, they are also found in other species of Karenia and at least one large fish kill has been traced to brevetoxins in Chattonella.

== Types ==
Brevetoxins are grouped into two main types: brevetoxin A and brevetoxin B. They are further classified by what chemical substituent (R group) is attached at certain positions within the core molecule.

| | Brevetoxin A | Brevetoxin B |
|---|---|---|
| chemical structure | Brevetoxin A | Brevetoxin B |
| subtypes | Brevetoxin-1 (PbTx-1) R = -CH_{2}C(=CH_{2})CHO; Brevetoxin-7 (PbTx-7) R = -CH_{2}C(=CH_{2})CH_{2}OH; Brevetoxin-10 (PbTx-10) R = -CH_{2}CH(-CH_{3})CH_{2}OH | Brevetoxin-2 (PbTx-2) R = -CH_{2}C(=CH_{2})CHO; Brevetoxin-3 (PbTx-3) R = -CH_{2}C(=CH_{2})CH_{2}OH; Brevetoxin-8 (PbTx-8) R = -CH_{2}COCH_{2}Cl; Brevetoxin-9 (PbTx-9) R = -CH_{2}CH(CH_{3})CH_{2}OH |

=== Others ===
- Brevetoxin-5 (PbTx-5): like brevetoxin-2, but acetylated hydroxyl group in position 38.
- Brevetoxin-6 (PbTx-6): like PbTx-2, but double bond 27-28 is epoxidated.

== Natural occurrence ==
Brevetoxins are primarily produced by Karenia brevis, though they are also found in other species of Karenia. At least one large fish kill has been traced to brevetoxins in Chattonella. The 2025 South Australian toxic algal bloom was traced to an hitherto obscure Karenia cristata.

== Synthesis in the lab ==
Brevetoxin-B was synthesized in 1995 by K. C. Nicolaou and coworkers in 123 steps with 91% average yield (final yield ~9·10^{−6}) and in 2004 in a total of 90 steps with an average 93% yield for each step (0.14% overall).

They reported their synthesis of Brevetoxin-1 in 1998. In 2009, Michael Crimmins and co-workers reported their synthesis of Brevetoxin-1 as well.

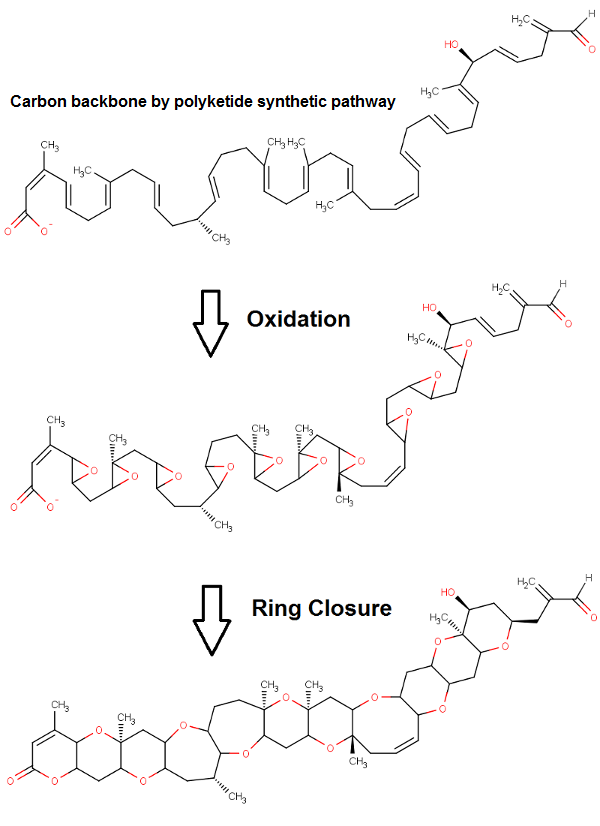
Proposed pathway for brevetoxin-B

Brevetoxins share the common backbone structure of polyketides, but there are several methyl and oxygen groups that are not typical in traditional polyketide biosynthesis. Labelling studies using carbon-13 confirm that the biosynthesis of brevetoxins greatly deviates from the polyketide synthetic pathway. The proposed biosynthetic pathway for brevetoxin class compounds begins with traditional polyketide synthesis to create the carbon backbone, using carbon originating from acetate modified by the citric acid cycle. After the carbon backbone is synthesized, oxidation produces the necessary epoxides and the multi-ring system is closed. It is unclear if the methyl groups seen in BTX-B are added after cyclization or during the modification of the polyketide metabolites, but it is clear that methyl groups can originate from sources outside of acetate such as S-adenosylmethionine.

From labelling experiments of Brevetoxin-B (BTX-B), out of 50 carbons in the molecule, 16 carbon signals were enhanced by [1-C13] acetate, 30 signals were enhanced by [2-C13] acetate, and 4 carbon signals were enhanced by [methyl-C13] methionine. 14 intact acetate units were identified with a fifteenth two carbon unit with a weak possibility of being an acetate unit. Based on the oxygen locations in BTX-B, this molecule could not be produced using a traditional polyketide synthesis pathway.

Attention was turned to the citric acid cycle to solve the problem. Acetate can be used in the polyketide synthetic pathway or modified by the citric acid cycle. Intermediate products of this cycle can then be reintroduced to the polyketide synthetic pathway, resulting in the addition of atypical carbon units. Previous studies of the citric acid pathway revealed three and four carbon units that can potentially explain the atypical condensation and oxidation pattern seen in BTX-B. That being said, there is currently no explanation as to why this particular pattern is favored.

== Mechanisms of action ==
The potent polyether brevetoxins produced by K. brevis activate voltage-sensitive sodium channels (VSSCs) by binding to site 5 on the alpha-subunit of VSSCs, which serve as key proteins in the structure of the cell membrane. The binding of brevetoxin to VSSCs produces three key effects: a lowering of the activation potential required to activate and open the sodium channel, persistent activation of the channel and therefore repetitive firing of nerves, and the inability to reverse the prolonged open state. This leads to a number of health problems in both humans and many animals species. For instance, pulmonary receptors associated with ligand-gated epithelial Na+ channels and cathepsin inhibition in macrophages have been reported to be affected.

== Toxicology ==
The uptake of brevetoxin into both humans and animals occurs primarily through inhalation and ingestion. Dermal contact, such as through swimming in red tides, is a suspected method of uptake, although direct contact with the toxin in the water is not well studied. In the case of inhalation, aerosolized toxins carried onshore in sea spray can cause respiratory irritation that can escalate, in more extreme cases, to more severe airway constriction, an effect observed at pM concentrations. More significant are the cases of ingestion, whether by direct swallowing of seawater during blooms of K. brevis or digestion of contaminated filter-feeding animals. After feeding upon K. brevis, aquatic invertebrates and shellfish in particular can accumulate brevetoxins, resulting in neurotoxic shellfish poisoning (NSP). In humans, the characteristic symptoms of NSP include Paresthesia (tingling), reversal of hot-cold temperature sensation, myalgia (muscle pain), vertigo, ataxia (loss of coordination), abdominal pain, nausea, diarrhea, headache, bradycardia (slow heart rate), dilated pupils and respiratory distress. Bioaccumulation effect has been observed for this toxin in the food web, and it has been noted that this accumulation is not restricted to times when K. brevis is present.

== Impacts of exposure on health and economy ==
=== Exposure ===
Brevetoxins in nature often occur from a phenomenon called red tide, where species of harmful algae such as Karenia brevis bloom, causing a red coloration of the water and potentially dangerous levels of brevetoxins. Brevetoxins in nature namely results in massive fish kills and the poisoning of marine mammals and other aquatic invertebrates, which in turn are a source of human health problems.

In marine mammals, a clear vector is difficult to identify due to confounding variables such as inability to confirm exposure and complicated pathological testing measures. One way to suggest a pathway into the marine mammal food web, is to examine what their primary food source is. A 2009 study examined a possible avenue of exposure though fish in cetaceans, mostly bottlenose dolphins, and sea grass in manatees. In this study, scientists also examine by what category they were exposed, by aerosols or ingestion, which is analyzed by measuring the levels of brevetoxin in the lungs versus in the stomach contents. They found that the majority of stomach contents in manatees were seagrass, and of those seagrass, the brevetoxin accumulation in the epiphytes was as high as 87%. In dolphins, the vector was more challenging to test for, because it was thought that fish die off before they can be eaten by larger animals, but this study also showed that fish can bioaccumulate brevetoxin and survive long enough to poison cetaceans. This is important because while a bloom might not be currently occurring, wildlife still could potentially die from exposure due to brevetoxin moving through the food web. Another way of assessing a pathway for exposure is the location of lesions and hemorrhaging, for example lesions in the lungs from inhalation.

Another study investigated differing concentrations of brevetoxin in different organs between avian, cetacean, and sirenian species, specifically a cormorant, bottlenose dolphin, and the Florida manatee. These organs include the liver, kidneys, brain, lungs, and stomach contents of all of these animals, and compared them to see where in the food web they were exposed, and to what extent. Manatees had the highest concentrations of brevetoxin in their livers, dolphins in their stomach contents, and cormorants in their brain and lungs. The kidney analysis showed that manatees and cormorants had equally high levels. Over all animals, the concentrations were highest in the liver, then kidneys, then lungs, and finally the brain, perhaps indicating a pathway for metabolizing brevetoxin. Dolphins in this study did not show much tissue damage compared to the other two, indicating that brevetoxin has a more profound lethal impact at lower concentrations.

Some symptoms of brevetoxicosis on the central nervous system include behavioral changes, muscular impairments, and disorientation. In manatees this is expressed in breathing difficulties, balance issues, and flexing of the back. In cormorants, they demonstrate difficulties flying. Another study showed that lemon sharks have similar issues with disorientation associated with brevetoxin exposure. In addition to brevetoxicosis, manatees also have impaired immune system function, making them unable to fight off the exposure and more susceptible to other diseases. This happens due to decreased lymphocyte response to exposure and inflammation in the affected areas, this study was done on sublethal exposed manatees.

One major concern for exposure is not just illness, but that brevetoxin can alter human DNA in lymphocytes, impacting immune function.

=== Public health and economy ===
The range and degree of human health effects seems to vary annually and temporally in coastal regions, depending on the red tide density as well as variation in toxicity differences among dinoflagellate strains and their subsequent consumers. The Gulf of Mexico, and in particular the west coast of Florida, is the most heavily impacted by the adverse health and environmental effects of nearly annual K. brevis blooms. This region has suffered significant economic losses in local communities that rely on tourism and recreational fishing along with bad publicity over the years. Shellfish poisonings have been known about in Florida since the 1880s, although the cause was not identified as K. brevis until 1960.

The fishing industry loses around 18 million dollars annually due to brevetoxin exposure and the resulting fish kills. Also, around one million dollars has been spent annually on public health due to shellfish poisoning from 1987 to 1992. A major obstacle for these industries and public health is inability to contain a bloom, and it is undetectable in taste and smell, only chemically.

The metabolism of brevetoxins in shellfish is particularly concerning, as certain derivatives have been shown to remain in the animal over extended periods of time. It has been shown that the main toxin produced by K. brevis, PbTx-2, is rapidly metabolized, resulting in the production of metabolites that endure in the animal's system for a significantly longer period of time. This stands in contrast to PbTx-3, which is typically eliminated from the shellfish in more or less its original form within a few weeks.

With respect to ichthyotoxicity, reports of massive fish kills have been reported in the Gulf of Mexico as far back as 1844. Originally, fish bioassay-guided fractionation was used to isolate the toxins, but accumulation in or food-web transfer by fish has not been regarded as a threat. Steidinger hypothesized that the presence of brevetoxin found in dolphin mortalities and prey mortalities in 1987-1988 were in part due to brevetoxin transfer through fish. While dangerous levels of brevetoxins have not been found in the muscles of live fish to date, the internal organs of fish are highly susceptible to dangerous levels of toxicity and should not be eaten. It is conjectured that chronic low-level exposure to brevetoxin metabolites can occur through shellfish and fish, although the effects of this have not been studied in detail and remain largely unknown.

== Monitoring and regulation ==
Brevetoxin concentrations in seafood and the regulation of toxic substance monitoring in the animals is concerning. In Florida, only oysters and clams are monitored for NSP. Scallops are not monitored, although scallop-related NSP does not normally occur because in most cases, the muscle which does not accumulate brevetoxin to dangerous levels is consumed. Additionally, scallops are less tolerant to brevetoxins as compared to other bivalves and die off quickly after exposure to K. brevis red tides. However, smaller bivalves such as chione clams and coquinas can accumulate extremely high levels of brevetoxins and are not monitored, which could potentially impact both human and wildlife health in negative ways. According to evidence from Poli et al., whelks are implicated in an NSP event in 1996.

The FWC marine mammal pathobiology lab collects and tests manatee carcasses for brevetoxin exposure. In 2015 alone, there were 170 positive carcasses and 107 suspected cases, resulting in a total of 277 manatees. In 2004 there were 107 dolphin deaths in just two months around the Florida panhandle, due to brevetoxicosis. Both cormorants and manatees have been rehabbed for brevetoxicosis, but no dolphins have survived it.

== Nitrogen and phosphorus availability vs toxicity level ==
Nitrogen and phosphorus grow a K. brevis red tide. Although K. brevis is initiated off shore, it will grow from nutrients (phosphorus and nitrogen) found on the shore. Along the southwest coast of Florida, when surface summer south winds blow phosphorus, nitrogen, green algae, and cyanobacteria into K. brevis that has come close to shore, there is a massive growth in the K. brevis red tide. The waves crashing break the cells open aerosolizing the subsequent brevetoxins which cause respiratory illnesses in humans. In 2018, MOTE Marine in Sarasota, FL updated their frequently asked questions to make it more clear that nutrients (nitrogen is a nutrient found in fertilizer) can grow K. brevis.

Along the west coast of Florida, the early phase of K. brevis blooms are initiated by northerly winds, resulting in upwelling events that cause nutrients to rise towards the surface of the water and transport multiple Karenia cell species towards the shore. Here they concentrate and either continue to grow or are taken up by onshore winds that spread the cells over beaches and near shore communities. It has been shown that K. brevis blooms are limited by available nitrogen (N) or phosphorus (P), but until recently it was not clear what sources K. brevis was utilizing for these key developmental nutrients. The most likely proposition is some combination of the upwelling of subsurface nutrients, land runoff (agricultural and sugar plantations, cattle ranches, golf courses, theme parks, septic systems, etc.) N2-fixation, drainage from phosphate mines and atmospheric deposition provides the necessary support for the blooms.

In addition to the breaking of the cells by waves, K. brevis cells can die because N-limitation directly affects the growth potential of blooms and the toxicity of K. brevis cells that comprise them. When N-limitation is present, intracellular brevetoxin concentrations (fg/μm^{3}) increased up to 2.5-fold in laboratory cultures, implying that during periods of N-limitation of algal growth, there is a higher chance of brevetoxin influx into the marine food web. The toxin content per cell increases when algal growth becomes P-limited. Various field measurements collected in the Gulf of Mexico have shown that the brevetoxin content of K. brevis cells is between 1 and 68 pg/cell; however, Hardison et al. discovered that during periods of transient P- and N-limitation, there is a 2- to 5-fold increase in brevetoxins per mole of cell carbon or unit of cell volume. Hardison concluded that this data suggest that the exposure of marine ecosystems to significantly different toxin levels depends on the nutrient status of the K. brevis cells. While brevetoxins remain intracellular during early stages of bloom development, the triggering of apoptosis and cell lysis with age release the toxins into the surrounding waters, implying that greater P-limitation that results in more cell death ultimately elevates brevetoxin levels. These high levels may persist in a food chain long after a bloom has subsided due to brevetoxin's high affinity for adsorbing to biological surfaces like sea grass fronds, and thereby accumulating in consuming organisms.

Overall, brevetoxins seem to increase under N- and P-limitation, however, the concentration of brevetoxins per cell under P-limitation has been reported to be roughly twice that under N-limitation. One major concern of this is that management of shellfish bed closures operating under the assumption that brevetoxin concentrations per cell do not vary may compromise public safety if a bloom became nutrient limited.

== See also ==
- Algal bloom
- Red tide
- Ciguatoxin
- Domoic acid
- Okadaic acid
- Saxitoxin
- Tetrodotoxin
