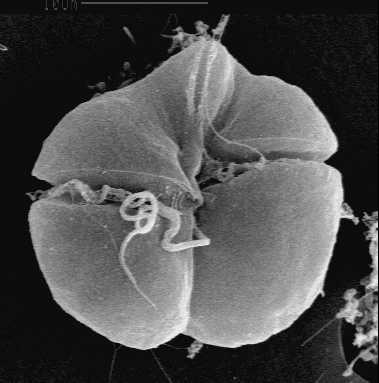

Scientific classification
- Domain: Eukaryota
- Clade: Sar
- Clade: Alveolata
- Division: Dinoflagellata
- Class: Dinophyceae
- Order: Gymnodiniales
- Family: Kareniaceae
- Genus: Karenia
- Species: K. brevis

Binomial name
- Karenia brevis (Davis) G. Hansen et Moestrup

= Karenia brevis =

Species of dinoflagellate

Karenia brevis is a microscopic, single-celled, photosynthetic organism in the genus Karenia. It is a marine dinoflagellate commonly found in the waters of the Gulf of Mexico. It is the organism responsible for the "Florida red tides" that affect the coastal parts of Florida, Texas and Mexico. K. brevis has been known to travel great lengths around the Florida peninsula and as far north as the Carolinas.

Each cell has two flagella that allow it to move through the water in a spinning motion. K. brevis is unarmored, and does not contain peridinin. Cells are between 20 and 40 μm in diameter. K. brevis naturally produces a suite of potent neurotoxins collectively called brevetoxins, which cause gastrointestinal and neurological problems in other organisms and are responsible for large die-offs of marine organisms and seabirds.

== History ==
The classification of K. brevis has changed over time as advances in technology are made.

Karenia brevis (K. brevis) was named for Dr. Karen A. Steidinger in 2000 but was previously known as Gymnodinium breve and Ptychodiscus brevis. It was first named Gymnodinium brevis in 1948, but was later changed to Gymnodinium breve, which correlates with the guidelines of the International Code of Botanical Nomenclature. In 1979 it was categorized under the genus Ptychodiscus and named Ptychodiscus brevis as new research showed it fit better under this genus because of its morphology, biochemistry, and ultrastructure. Then in 1989, scientists agreed this organism should be referred to as its original name (G. breve). It was then reclassified and transferred to the new genus Karenia, which was established at the University of Copenhagen in 2000.

K. brevis was first identified in Florida in 1947, but anecdotal reports in the Gulf of Mexico date back to the 1530s. Outbreaks of K. brevis have been known to occur since the Spanish explorers of the 15th and 16th centuries, as documented by Spanish explorers like Cabeza de Vaca. These explorers noted large fish kills that resemble the die offs seen in present-day due to K. brevis. C. C. Davis confirmed these die offs were due to K. brevis in 1948.

== Ecology and distribution ==
K. brevis has an optimum temperature range of 22–28 °C (72–82 °F), an optimum salinity range of 25-45 Practical Salinity Units (PSU), has adapted to "low-irradiance environments," and can utilize both organic and inorganic nitrogen and phosphorus compounds to survive. In its normal environment, K. brevis will move in the direction of greater light and against the direction of gravity, which will tend to keep the organism at the surface of whatever body of water it is suspended within. The swimming speed of K. brevis is about one metre per hour and the organism can be found throughout the year in the waters of the Gulf of Mexico at concentrations of ≤ 1,000 cell per liter.

Scientists have been unable to determine a definitive geographic range for K. brevis specifically because it is difficult to separate from the ten other species of Karenia, but K. brevis is the most common species occurring in the Gulf of Mexico.

Karenia brevis is the causative agent of red tide, which occurs when the organism multiplies to higher than normal concentrations. During these events the water can take on a reddish or pinkish coloration, giving these explosions in the K. brevis population the name of Florida Red Tide. These algal blooms caused by K. brevis produce brevetoxins, which can result in significant ecological impacts through the death of large numbers of marine animals and birds, to include marine mammals. Large scale fish kills are known to occur due to these Florida Red Tides caused by K. brevis. Fish species through the food chain are impacted, up to and including large predatory species such as sharks, as well as species typical in human consumption.

One researcher has stated that, "There is no single hypothesis that can account for blooms of K. brevis along the west coast of Florida". However, like most algae, their occurrence and survival depends on a variety of factors in their environment including water temperature, salinity, light, and nutrients/compounds present in the water. However it is suspected that abundant use of fertilizers in surrounding coastal areas as well as fertilizer run-off from more distant farms, carried by the rivers, might have an impact on algae growth.

Under favorable conditions, toxin-producing dinoflagellates such as K. brevis flourish and grow to high concentrations, an event termed a "harmful algal bloom" (HAB). While there are many different types of these HABs and the effects can vary, K. brevis is the causative agent of Florida Red Tides. Due to the toxin that K. brevis produces, these red tides can be detrimental to marine life and can even affect human populations along coasts where they occur.

== Impact on human health and activities ==
In areas where K. brevis is found at normal population levels, the organism is not known to cause harm to human health. It is only at times of unchecked population growth, resulting in harmful algal blooms, when the organism is of concern to human health and activities. The same cannot be said of shellfish harvested and consumed from these algal bloom areas. The brevetoxins released by K. brevis can be found in the flesh of shellfish during Florida Red Tides, potentially causing a condition known as Neurotoxic Shellfish Poisoning (NSP) in humans. Although no recorded human deaths have occurred from NSP, the poisoning does result in nausea, vomiting and a variety of neurological symptoms. Other than NSP, the effects on human health during Florida Red Tide are thought to be limited to respiratory and eye irritation to susceptible persons on the water or close to the shore of areas impacted by the Red Tide, and irritation of skin directly exposed to Florida Red Tide waters. Persons with pre-existing respiratory conditions such as asthma, emphysema or COPD may be more susceptible to harm from the respiratory irritation caused by K. brevis and may be advised to remain away from coastal areas during periods of Florida Red Tide.

The uncontrolled mass explosions of K. brevis populations resulting in Florida Red Tide also has a significant financial impact on the affected coastal areas. The primary source of revenue generation in many of the communities affected by K. brevis red tides is tourism. During periods of red tides this important source of revenue is often lost to the impacted coastal communities of Florida, often on the scale of tens of millions of dollars.

This particular protist is known to be harmful to humans, large fish, and other marine mammals. It has been found that the survival of scleractinian coral is negatively affected by brevetoxin. Scleractinian coral exhibits decreased rates of respiration when there is a high concentration of K. brevis.

== Effect of Karenia brevis on environment ==
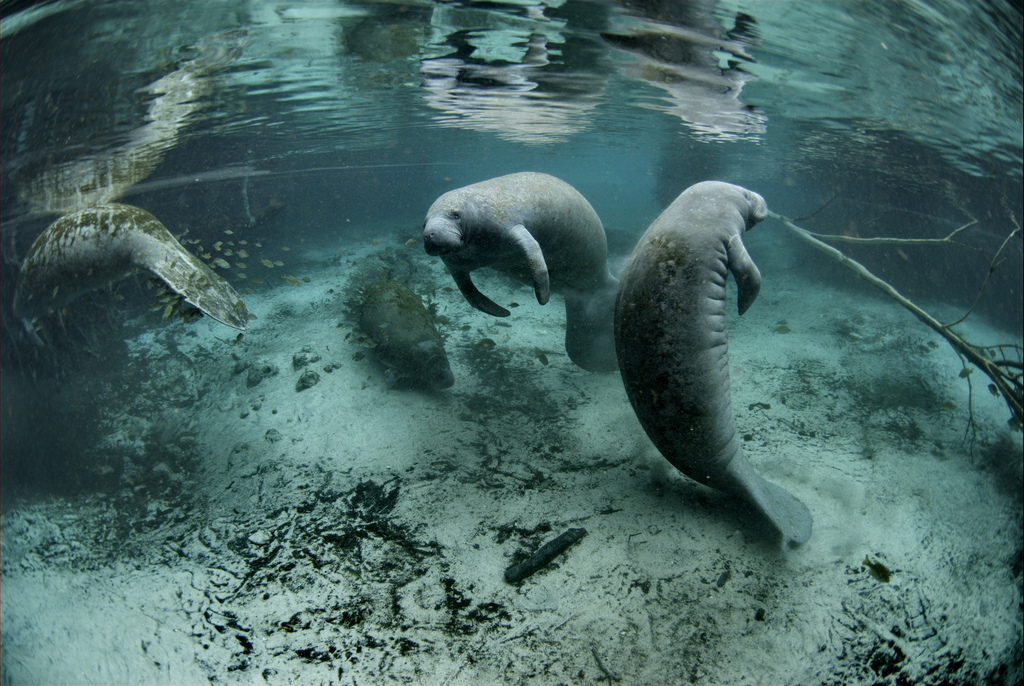
Florida manatee

Brevetoxins are a group of neurotoxic compounds released by K. brevis. At high concentration these brevetoxins can be fatal to fish, marine mammals, and birds. Brevetoxins also pose a threat to corals.

Large nearshore fish fatalities are caused by red-tide blooms. Shorebirds can also get infected with brevetoxins by consuming fish. Thus, red-tide blooms can have major level effects impacting the whole ecosystem. Additionally infected fish and shellfish pose a threat to the fishing industry and economy.

K. brevis red tides have also been found to be a significant factor in the mortality of multiple species of sea turtles. Specifically Kemp's ridleys, loggerheads, green turtles, and hawksbills, particularly along the west Florida coast. Since red tide is a major cause of stranded sea turtles, it contributes to the vulnerability of this endangered species.

K. brevis blooms pose other lethal health risks to marine animals like manatees. Extended occurrences of red tide blooms in the Gulf of Mexico have been associated with substantial instances of mortality in manatee populations. Brevetoxins can lower manatee's immune systems making them more at risk for other diseases. Additionally, brevetoxin has been correlated with oxidative stress in manatees.

Overall brevetoxins have grave effects on wildlife, and the multitude and compounded effects on entire marine ecosystems are not yet fully understood.

== Detection and monitoring ==
Traditional methods for the detection of K. brevis are based on microscopy or pigment analysis. These are time-consuming, and typically require a skilled microscopist for identification. Cultivation-based identification is extremely difficult and can take several months.

The traditional methods of detection and monitoring of K. brevis blooms from field measurements is labor-intensive and suffers from practical limitations on achieving real-time detection or monitoring. The "Brevebuster" is a deploy-able instrument that can be deployed on automated underwater vehicles or on stationary platforms that can optically detect the Florida red tides. A molecular, real-time PCR-based approach for sensitive and accurate detection of K. brevis cells in marine environments has therefore been developed. A real-time nucleic acid sequence-based amplification (NASBA) assay has been developed for detection of rbcL mRNA from K. brevis. NASBA is sensitive, rapid and effective, and may be used as an additional or alternative method to detect and quantify K. brevis in the marine environment.

Another technique for the detection of K. brevis is multiwavelength spectroscopy, which uses a model-based examination of UV-vis spectra. Methods of detection using satellite spectroscopy have also been developed. Satellite images from Medium Resolution Imaging Spectrometer (MERIS) and Moderate Resolution Imaging Spectroradiometer (MODIS) ocean color sensor, identify K. brevis by making use of its chlorophyll fluorescence and low backscattering characteristics. In addition to methods of detection of cells of K. brevis, enzyme-linked immunosorbent assay (ELISA) and liquid chromatography mass spectrometry (LCMS) have been developed for detecting brevetoxin in shellfish, are more sensitive than the standard mouse bioassay, and as of 2008, were being considered by the Interstate Shellfish Sanitation Conference for regulatory use.
