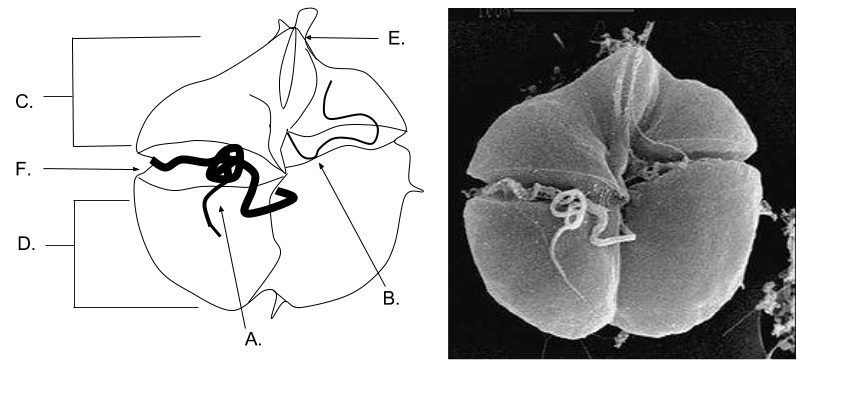
- Anatomy of Karenia brevis
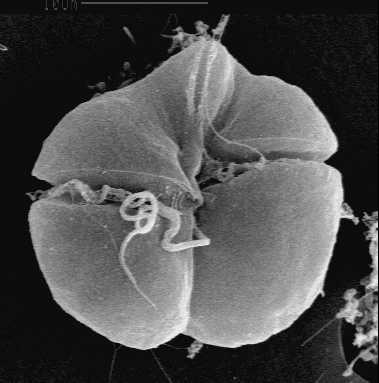
- Karenia brevis

Scientific classification
- Domain: Eukaryota
- Supergroup: Alveolata
- Division: Dinoflagellata
- Class: Dinophyceae
- Order: Gymnodiniales
- Family: Kareniaceae

= Kareniaceae =

Family of protists

Kareniaceae is an accepted marine family of relatively small, toxic, unarmored dinoflagellates belonging to the order Gymnodiniales. Species in the Kareniaceae clade often cause harmful discolored green algal blooms (HABs) that pose a safety and health risk to humans (H. sapiens) and the surrounding regions. Such blooms also pose a risk to coastal aquaculture worldwide, especially in places like France, the Atlantic Ocean, the English Channel and the Mediterranean Sea.

Species in this family produce neurotoxins like brevetoxins, which cause human shellfish poisoning (HSP), respiratory effects and mass fish death.

== Genera ==
- Asterodinium Sournia
- Brachidinium Sournia
- Gertia K.Takahashi et Iwataki
- Karenia G.Hansen et Moestrup
- Karlodinium Larsen
- Shimiella Ok, Jeong, Lee et Noh
- Takayama G.Hansen et Moestrup
