= Marine oomycetes =

Species of oomycete that inhabit oceans, coastal, and estuarine environments

Marine oomycetes are species of oomycete that inhabit oceans, coastal, and estuarine environments. They belong to the phylum oomycota and kingdom stramenopila, occupying diverse roles as parasites, pathogen and saprophytes infecting diatoms, algae, plants, and animals, or consuming dead organic matter in water. These organisms contribute significantly to nutrient cycling, and host population dynamics in marine ecological niches.

== Characteristics ==
Marine oomycetes are heterotrophic, filamentous eukaryotic organisms that have morphological features similar to fungi, characterized by mycelial growth, modes of reproduction and infection. Historically, these similarities led them to be classified as fungi. However, later morphological, molecular and phylogenetic analyses placed them within the Kingdom Stramenopile, making them more closely related to algae, diatoms, and plants.

The cell walls of marine oomycetes are primarily composed of β-1,3- and β-1,6-glucans, along with cellulose, a composition that distinguishes them from true fungi, which typically have chitin-rich cell walls. Their vegetative hyphae are generally hyaline (transparent) and often lack septation.

Marine oomycetes exhibit diverse roles in nature like decomposing organic matter such as leaf debris in coastal marine environments while many infecting a range of hosts including marine algae, diatoms, vertebrates and invertebrates.

== Life and reproduction ==
Marine oomycetes reproduction involves the formation of asexual reproductive fruiting bodies called sporangia on specialized hyphae. These sporangia release motile zoospores, which exhibit directional swimming behavior to locate suitable hosts for infection. Zoospores are asexual biflagellate spores without a cell wall that can swim in water acting as propagules of infections. They navigate their environment by responding to various stimuli, including chemical gradients (chemotaxis), and electrical fields (electrotaxis). This targeted movement helps zoospores to find and infect hosts in marine environments.

Once a zoospore lands on a suitable host surface like a marine diatom, it sticks to it, sheds off or retracts its flagella, and develops a cell wall in a process called encystment. Upon successful penetrating into the host by developing specialized hyphae, a special structure called thallus emerges to feed on nutrients of host and further reproduce. Most of the marine oomycetes infecting diatoms, algae and invertebrates are holocarpic i.e. the entire thallus can transform into a sporangium, releasing new zoospores to continue the cycle. However, not all marine oomycetes are holocarpic, and some are eucarpic. In these species only a portion of the thallus becomes reproductive while the rest remains vegetative.

Sexual reproduction in marine oomycetes involves production of resting sexual oospores. While it has been reported to occur in the genus Olpidiopsis, there is a limited information in marine oomycetes overall.

== Role in infection ==
=== Microorganisms ===
Marine oomycetes are important intracellular parasitoids of microorganisms, particularly diatoms, in coastal and open-ocean ecosystems. Marine oomycetes parasitizing diatoms have been detected in the Arctic Ocean, Northwest Iceland, North Atlantic coastal waters, and the pacific northwestern coast of United States. These include species of Ectrogella, Lagenisma, Olpidiopsis, and Miracula, infecting different diatoms such as Licmophora, Pseudo-nitzschia, Coscinodiscus, and Minidiscus. Some marine oomycetes also target toxin-producing diatoms, notably species of Pseudo-nitzschia. A study has shown that a marine oomycete species can rewire the metabolome of its host diatom to control host physiology and promote infection.

=== Plants and seaweeds ===
Marine oomycetes also infect various plant and algal species, particularly in coastal and estuarine environments. Species of Halophytophthora, colonize fallen leaves of the red mangrove tree in tropical and subtropical regions. These oomycetes act primarily as saprotrophs, decomposing fallen plant material, but some species can also be pathogenic to living hosts. Halophytophthora zosterae has been reported to restrict seed viability and seedling development of the eelgrass zostera marina along the coast of North america and Eurasia. Another species, Pythium marinum is a facultative parasite of the red alga Porphyra miniata.

=== Animals ===
Some marine holocarpic pathogens can infect animals such as nematodes, crustaceans, and mollusks. Lagenidium callinectes infects the eggs of the blue crab, while Halioticida noduliformans has been reported to infect the eggs of european lobster. Pythium flevoense was identified as the cause of dermatitis in the harbor porpoise, marking one of the first cases of a marine mammal infected by an oomycete. In addition, this pathogen can also infect freshwater copepods and ayu fish larvae.

== Role in ecology ==
Marine oomycetes play a crucial role in shaping coastal and open-ocean ecosystems as decomposers of sea litter and parasites of planktons, particularly diatoms. Several species including from genera Lagenisma can potentially regulate algal blooms by parasitizing phytoplankton like species of Coscinodiscus and Cerataulina during periods of high abundance, although the extent of their influence remains uncertain. In mangrove ecosystems, species of Halophytophthora act as major saprophytic decomposers of fallen mangrove leaves, playing a vital part in nutrient cycling. In Arctic environments, some marine oomycetes have been reported to encode genes involved in carbon cycling such as those for carbohydrate metabolism (e.g. pectate lyase, chitinase, mannanase), possibly playing roles in both microbial food webs and biogeochemical cycling of carbon. The ongoing warming of oceans due to climate change may increase their ecological impact by introducing lower-latitude species into new regions, potentially reshaping primary producer communities.
