= Pseudo-nitzschia australis =

Scientific classification
- Domain: Eukaryota
- Clade: Sar
- Clade: Stramenopiles
- Division: Ochrophyta
- Clade: Bacillariophyta
- Class: Bacillariophyceae
- Order: Bacillariales
- Family: Bacillariaceae
- Genus: Pseudo-nitzschia
- Species: P. australis

Binomial name
- Pseudo-nitzschia australis Frenguelli, 1939

Species of pennate diatom found in temperate and sub-tropic marine waters

Pseudo-nitzschia australis is a pennate diatom found in temperate and sub-tropic marine waters, such as off the coast of California and Argentina. This diatom is a Harmful Micro Algae that produces toxic effects on a variety of organisms through its production of domoic acid, a neurotoxin. Toxic effects have been observed in a variety of predatory organisms such as pelicans, sea lions, and humans. If exposed to a high enough dose, these predators will die as a result, and there is no known antidote. The potential indirect mortality associated with P. australis is of great concern to humans as toxic algae blooms, including blooms of P. australis, continue to increase in frequency and severity over recent years. Blooms of P. australis are believed to result from high concentrations of nitrates and phosphates in stream and river runoff, as well as coastal upwelling, which are also sources of other harmful algae blooms.

== Morphology ==
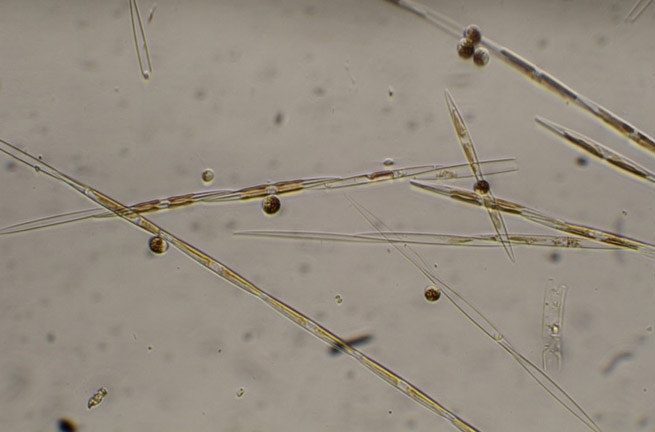
Image of Pseudo-nitzschia

Pseudo-nitzschia australis are a part of the genus which are bilaterally symmetrical diatoms with a protective cell wall layer called a silica. Their body plan is such that cells overlap with adjacent cells, allowing them to form chains. The cells are needle shaped, and the overlap between cells can be between one-third to one-half each cell length. Their total body length can be from 68-144 μm long and their width can range from 3-8 μm wide.

== Life cycle ==
Pseudo-nitzschia australis can reproduce both sexually and asexually by binary fission. Sexual reproduction occurs by auxo-sporulation in which gametes fuse to form a zygote. Sexual reproduction has also been found to correlate with higher levels of domoic acid production Population growth of this species is seasonal and can depend on the amount of water upwelled and nutrient concentrations present off of the coast.

== Habitat ==
These diatoms in a neritic zone meaning that they reside in shallow parts of the ocean with a depth ranging from 0 to 170 meters deep. Their temperature range is from around -1 °C to 29 °C. They can live in temperate and subtropical waters. Common distributions are the American West Coast, Australia, New Zealand, and North Atlantic Ocean.

== Harmful algae blooms ==
There are many sources of harmful algae blooms. For instance, coastal upwellings can bring harmful algae to surface waters where they can photosynthesize due to an increase in light at the surface waters. This increase in photosynthesis can increase algal reproduction and the release of domoic acid. In addition to natural events, human activities such as deforestation and farming can lead to an increase in nutrients in nearby watersheds. As nutrient levels in the water increase, the algae population can increase to excessive levels. Blooms off of the Pacific Coast and Gulf of Mexico have increased in frequency over the 21st century, which scientists speculate may be due to global climate change. Algae blooms are considered harmful when the algae produce toxins that cause a deleterious effect on the ecosystem. P. australis produces domoic acid, which is what makes them dangerous to other organisms.

== Effects on humans ==
=== Amnesic shellfish poisoning ===
Domoic acid can cause Amnesic Shellfish Poisoning (ASP) in humans that eat them. ASP is only a concern when algae in the ecosystem increases to high levels during an algal bloom. Shellfish are susceptible to accumulation of toxins due to their morphology as filter feeders. When they filter feed algae containing domoic acid, they can have accumulation of this toxin in their tissue. The poison has been detected in organisms such as mussels, oysters and clams and crabs. Physical symptoms in humans from ASP include diarrhea, nausea, vomiting, and abdominal cramps. Neurological symptoms can include headaches, disorientation, dizziness, short-term memory loss, coma and death. Cooking organisms which have accumulated domoic acid will not reduce their toxicity.

=== Economics ===
Peudo-nitzschia australius algal blooms can have a negative effect on fisheries and local economies. Due to amnesic shellfish poisoning (ASP) and its major threat to human health, fisheries are required to close when domoic acid levels reach an unsafe level in order to protect human safety. In New Zealand, one fishery had to shut down for four years while the domoic acid levels were considered too high to be safe.

== Notable Pseudo-nitzschia australis blooms ==
=== Monterey Bay ===
Monterey Bay, located in central California, experienced a toxic P. australis algal bloom in the spring of 2015 leading to detrimental ecological issues such as marine organism illness and mortality. This bloom was caused by an unusual prolonged period of oceanic warming and upwelling which created conditions that allowed for an explosion of the P. australis species. The increase of available nitrogen from upwelling allowed for an increase in domoic acid synthesis. This bloom event lead to the temporary closure of fisheries such as razor clam and crab fisheries up the west coast from California to Washington due to the harmful impacts of domoic acid on human health. The closure of fisheries led to a request from the governor of California for a federal disaster declaration Effects of this harmful algal bloom on wildlife included mortality and seizures of a wide variety of marine species off of the coast. Domoic acid was detected in marine mammals such as whales, dolphins, sea lions, seals, and porpoises.

=== French Atlantic Coast ===
The first noted occurrence of the unusual toxic bloom of pseudo-nitzschia species on the French Atlantic coast happened in 1995. Pseudo-nitschia species have been observed in the waters every spring and autumn since 2006, but in low quantities. 2010 was an outlier year in which there was a larger bloom most likely caused by upwelling and nutrient runoff from a large storm. Additionally, this was the first year the species P. australis had been observed. This bloom resulted in a ban on shellfish harvesting due to toxic domoic acid build up in bivalves off of the coast.

=== Puget Sound ===
The P. australis was first observed in Washington in razor clams in 1991. The domoic acid toxin produced by P. australis causes amnesic shellfish poisoning (ASP), and the presence of domoic acid caused shellfish harvesting on the coast to be closed in 1991, 1998, and 2002. These closures were coast-wide until a domoic acid monitoring program was established. The Olympic Region Harmful Algal Bloom monitoring partnership focuses on the Olympic coast, and the SoundToxins monitoring program focuses on Puget Sound. These monitoring programs track harmful algal blooms and monitor domoic acid levels in marine organisms known for accumulating domoic acid, such as Pacific razor clams and Dungeness crabs. The monitoring programs have since enabled the Department of Health to implement more targeted closures that only prohibit shellfish harvest from sections of the coastline.

== Toxicity ==
Domoic acid (DA) is a neurotoxin known to cause Amnesic Shellfish Poisoning (ASP) in humans and other predators that consume contaminated aquatic organisms that have consumed P. australius. DA has been isolated in several species of red algae, but is produced mostly by members of the Pseudo-nitzschia genus.

Chemical structure of domoic acid

The neurotoxicity of DA is due to its classification as a glutamate receptor agonist. An agonist causes an increase in cellular function, so it prolong neurological signals after the signal should have ceased to exist. In the case of DA, glutamate receptors are activated to open ion-gated channels in neurons, which leads to a variety of neurotoxic effects. At high enough doses, an organism will die of DA poisoning, while sublethal levels may cause a diverse range of effects on the central nervous system. There have been many experimental studies performed on animals, in addition to analysis of animals that were poisoned by DA in nature. Experiments showed that mammals exhibit a variety of behavioral and motor impairments, such as seizing, scratching, twitching, yawning, and head-waving. Upon dissection, organisms exposed acutely and chronically to DA were found to have brain lesions along the hippocampus and limbic system. Additionally, gross cardiac lesions were found in California sea lions, and retinal lesions found in some but not all species examined. DA exhibits both acute and chronic toxicity, and has no known antidote.

Biosynthesis of Domoic acid involves a coordinated cluster of genes. Brunson et al. (2018) used genomic and transcriptomic analyses to identify a unique toxin biosynthesis gene cluster in P. australis, including polyketide synthase (PKS) and nonribosomal peptide synthetase (NRPS) related genes, which are significantly upregulated during bloom events. The toxin synthesis pathway is closely linked to intracellular nitrogen metabolism and regulated by environmental factors such as light and nutrient availability.

== Effects on marine life ==
Marine mammals and seabirds have displayed adverse effects when in contact with Domoic acid including neurological effects and mortality. However, organisms such as shellfish and fish can ingest and accumulate domoic acid without ill effects. Despite these organisms not being effected, they can contribute to toxicity accumulating in the organisms that eat them. Domoic acid can accumulate up the food chain and cause adverse effects in marine organisms that are in higher trophic levels. It can cause neurological syndromes, gastrointestinal syndromes, acute retina issues, motor sensory abnormalities, heart defects, and morphological brain changes.

== Environmental Triggers and Bloom Impacts ==
Bloom formation of Pseudo-nitzschia australis is influenced by several environmental factors:

- Nutrient concentrations: Elevated nitrate and phosphate levels promote growth.
- Sea temperature: Optimal growth occurs between 10–20 °C; warming may expand its range.
- Water column stability: Stratified waters favor bloom development.

These harmful algal blooms cause mass mortalities in marine wildlife such as seabirds and marine mammals and lead to significant economic losses in fisheries. For example, a 1991 bloom off the coast of eastern Canada caused over 100 human poisonings and fishery closures.
