= Riedelia =

Riedelia may refer to:

- Riedelia (plant)
- Riedelia (fly)
- Riedelia (gastropod)
- Riedelia (diatom)
