= Planktivore =

Aquatic organism that feeds on planktonic food

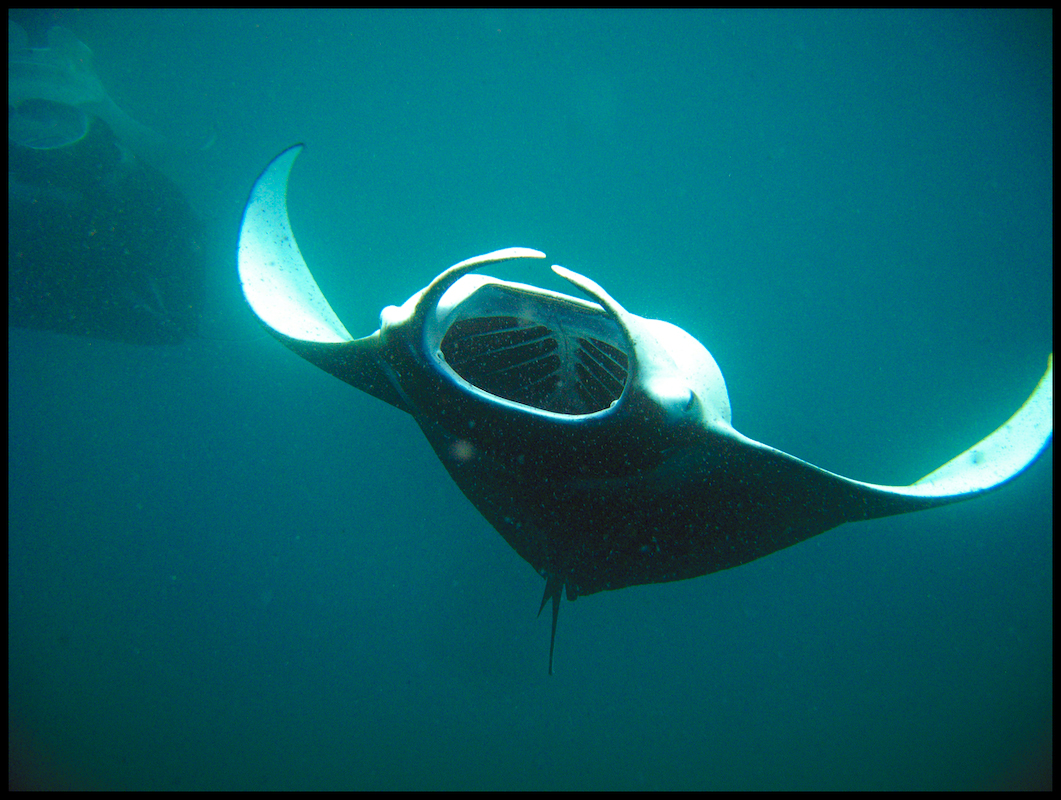
Manta ray consuming plankton

A planktivore is an aquatic organism that feeds on planktonic food, including zooplankton and phytoplankton. Planktivorous organisms encompass a range of some of the planet's smallest to largest multicellular animals in both the present day and in the past billion years; basking sharks and copepods are just two examples of giant and microscopic organisms that feed upon plankton.

Planktivory can be an important mechanism of top-down control that contributes to trophic cascades in aquatic and marine systems. There is a tremendous diversity of feeding strategies and behaviors that planktivores utilize to capture prey. Some planktivores utilize tides and currents to migrate between estuaries and coastal waters; other aquatic planktivores reside in lakes or reservoirs where diverse assemblages of plankton are present, or migrate vertically in the water column searching for prey. Planktivore populations can impact the abundance and community composition of planktonic species through their predation pressure, and planktivore migrations facilitate nutrient transport between benthic and pelagic habitats.

Planktivores are an important link in marine and freshwater systems that connect primary producers to the rest of the food chain. As climate change causes negative effects throughout the global oceans, planktivores are often directly impacted through changes to food webs and prey availability. Additionally, harmful algal blooms (HABs) can negatively impact many planktivores and can transfer harmful toxins from the phytoplankton, to the planktivores, and along up the food chain. As an important source of revenue for humans through tourism and commercial uses in fisheries, many conservation efforts are going on globally to protect these diverse animals known as planktivores.

== Plankton and planktivory across taxonomic classes ==
=== Phytoplankton: prey ===
Plankton are defined as any type of organism that is unable to swim actively against currents and are thus transported by the physical forcing of tides and currents in the ocean. Phytoplankton form the lowest trophic level of marine food webs and thus capture light energy and materials to provide food and energy for hundreds of thousands of types of planktivores. Because they require light and abundant nutrients, phytoplankton are typically found in surface waters where light rays can penetrate water. Nutrients that sustain phytoplankton include nitrate, phosphate, silicate, calcium, and micronutrients like iron; however, not all phytoplankton require all these identified nutrients and thus differences in nutrient availability impact phytoplankton species composition. This class of microscopic, photosynthetic organisms includes diatoms, coccolithophores, protists, cyanobacteria, dinoflagellates, and other microscopic algae. Phytoplankton conduct photosynthesis via pigments in their cells; phytoplankton can use chlorophyll as well as other accessory photosynthetic pigments like fucoxanthin, chlorophyll c, alloxanthin, and carotenoids, depending on species. Due to their environmental requirements for light and nutrients, phytoplankton are most commonly found near continental margins, the equator, high-latitudes, and nutrient-rich areas. They also form the foundation of the biological pump, which transports carbon to depth in the ocean.

=== Zooplankton: predators and prey ===
Zooplankton ("zoo" meaning "animal") are generally consumers of other organisms for food. Zooplankton may consume either phytoplankton or other zooplankton, making them the smallest class of planktivores. They are common to most marine pelagic environments and act as an important step in the food chain to transfer energy up from primary producers to the rest of the marine food web. Some zooplankton remain planktonic for their entire lives, while others eventually grow large enough to swim against currents. For instance, fish are born as planktonic larvae but once they grow large enough to swim, they are no longer considered plankton. Many taxonomic groups (e.g. fishes, krill, corals, etc.) are zooplankton at some point in their lives. For example, oysters begin as planktonic larvae; during this stage when they are considered zooplankton, they consume phytoplankton. Once they mature to adulthood, oysters continue to consume phytoplankton. The spiny water flea is another example of a planktivorous invertebrate.

Some of the largest communities of zooplankton exist in high latitude systems like the eastern Bering Sea; pockets of dense zooplankton abundance also exist in the California Current and the Gulf of Mexico. Zooplankton are, in turn, common prey items for planktivores; they respond to environmental change very rapidly due to their relatively short life spans, and so scientists can track their dynamics to understand what might be occurring in the larger marine food web and environment. The relative ratios of certain zooplankton in the larger zooplankton community can also indicate an environmental change (e.g., eutrophication) that may be significant. For instance, an increase in rotifer abundance in the Great Lakes has been correlated with abnormally high levels of nutrients (eutrophication).

=== Vertebrates: predators and prey ===
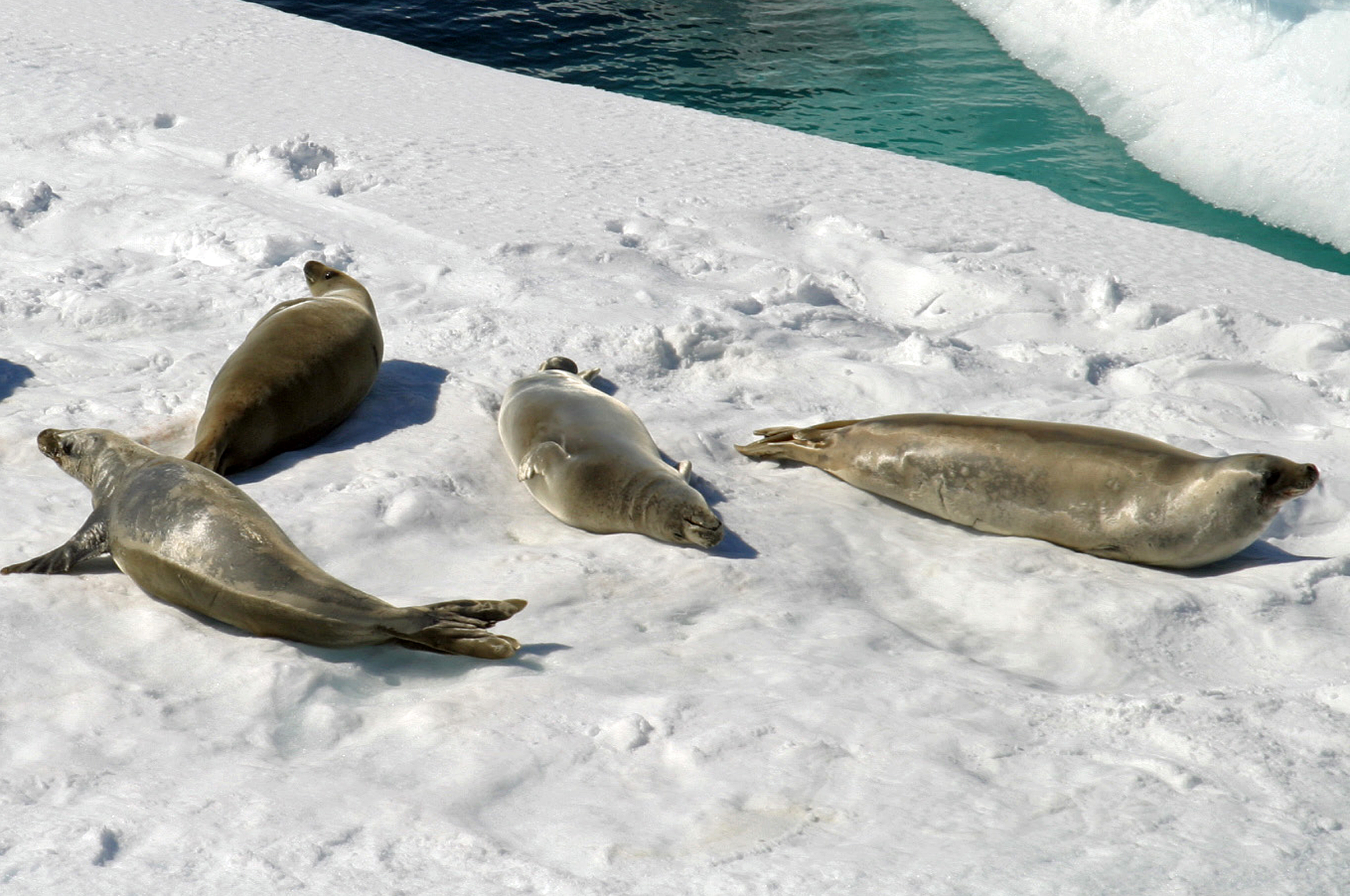
A group of crabeater seals relaxing on an iceberg. These pinnipeds are planktivores and feed primarily on krill.

Many fishes are planktivorous during all or part of their life cycles, and these planktivorous fish are important to human industry and as prey for other organisms in the environment like seabirds and piscivorous fishes. Planktivores comprise a large component of tropical ecosystems; in the Indo-Australian Archipelago, one study identified 350 planktivorous fish species in one studied grid cell and found that 27% of all fish species in this region were planktivorous. This global study found that coral reef habitats globally have a disproportionate amount of planktivorous fishes. In other habitats, examples of planktivorous fishes include many types of salmon like the pink salmon, sandeels, sardines, and silvery lightfish. In ancient systems (read more below), the Titanichthys was an early massive vertebrate pelagic planktivore, with a lifestyle similar to that of the modern basking, whale, and megamouth sharks, all of whom are also planktivores.

Sea birds can also be planktivores; least auklets, crested auklets, storm petrels, ancient auklets, phalaropes, and many penguins are all examples of avian planktivores. Planktivorous seabirds can be indicators of ecosystem status because their dynamics often reflect processes affecting many trophic levels, like the consequences of climate change. Blue whales and bowhead whales as well as some seals like the crabeater seal (Lobodon carcinophagus) are also planktivorous. Blue whales were recently found to consume a vast amount more plankton than was previously understood, representing an important element of the ocean biogeochemical cycle.

== Feeding strategies ==
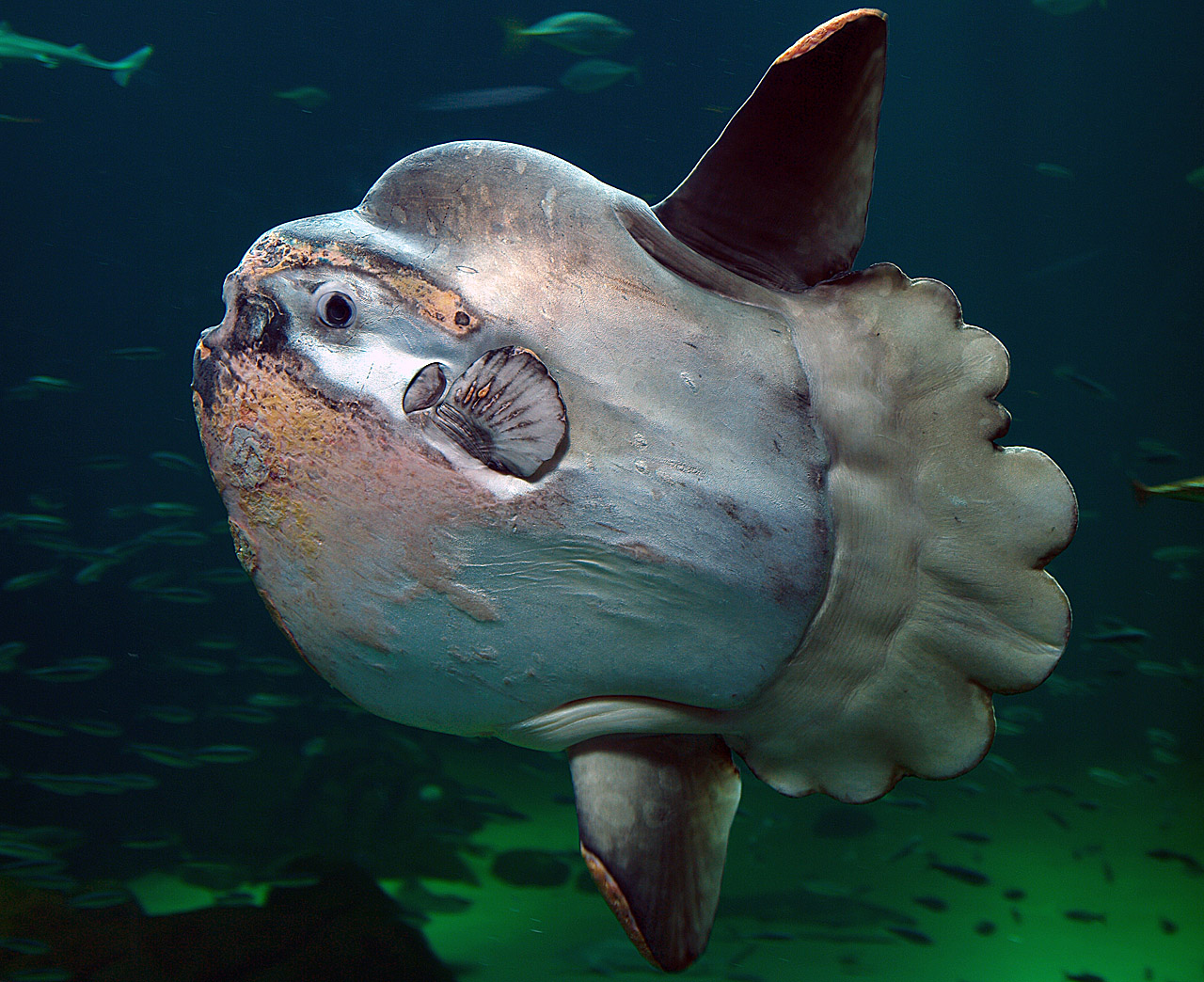
Ocean sunfish can alternate between planktivory and consuming other food sources, making them facultative planktivores. The main plankton sunfish consume are jellies.

As previously mentioned, some plankton communities are well-studied and respond to environmental change very rapidly; understanding unusual plankton dynamics can elucidate potential consequences to planktivorous species and the larger marine food chain.

One well-studied planktivore species is the gizzard shad (Dorosoma cepedianum) which has a voracious appetite for various forms of plankton across its life cycle. Planktivores can be either obligate planktivores, meaning they can only feed on plankton, or facultative planktivores, which take plankton when available but eat other types of food as well. In the case of the gizzard shad, they are obligate planktivores when larvae and juveniles, in part due to their very small mouth size; larval gizzard shad are most successful when small zooplankton are present in adequate quantities within their habitat. As they grow, gizzard shad become omnivores, consuming phytoplankton, zooplankton, and larger pieces of nutritious detritus. Adult gizzard shad consume large volumes of zooplankton until it becomes scarce, then start consuming organic debris instead. Larval fishes and blueback herring are other well-studied examples of obligate planktivores, whereas fishes like the ocean sunfish can alternate between plankton and other food sources (i.e., are facultative planktivores). Facultative planktivores tend to be more opportunistic and live in ecosystems with many types of food sources. Obligate planktivores have fewer options for prey choices; they are typically restricted to marine pelagic ecosystems that have a dominant plankton presence, such as highly productive upwelling regions.

=== Mechanics of consuming plankton ===
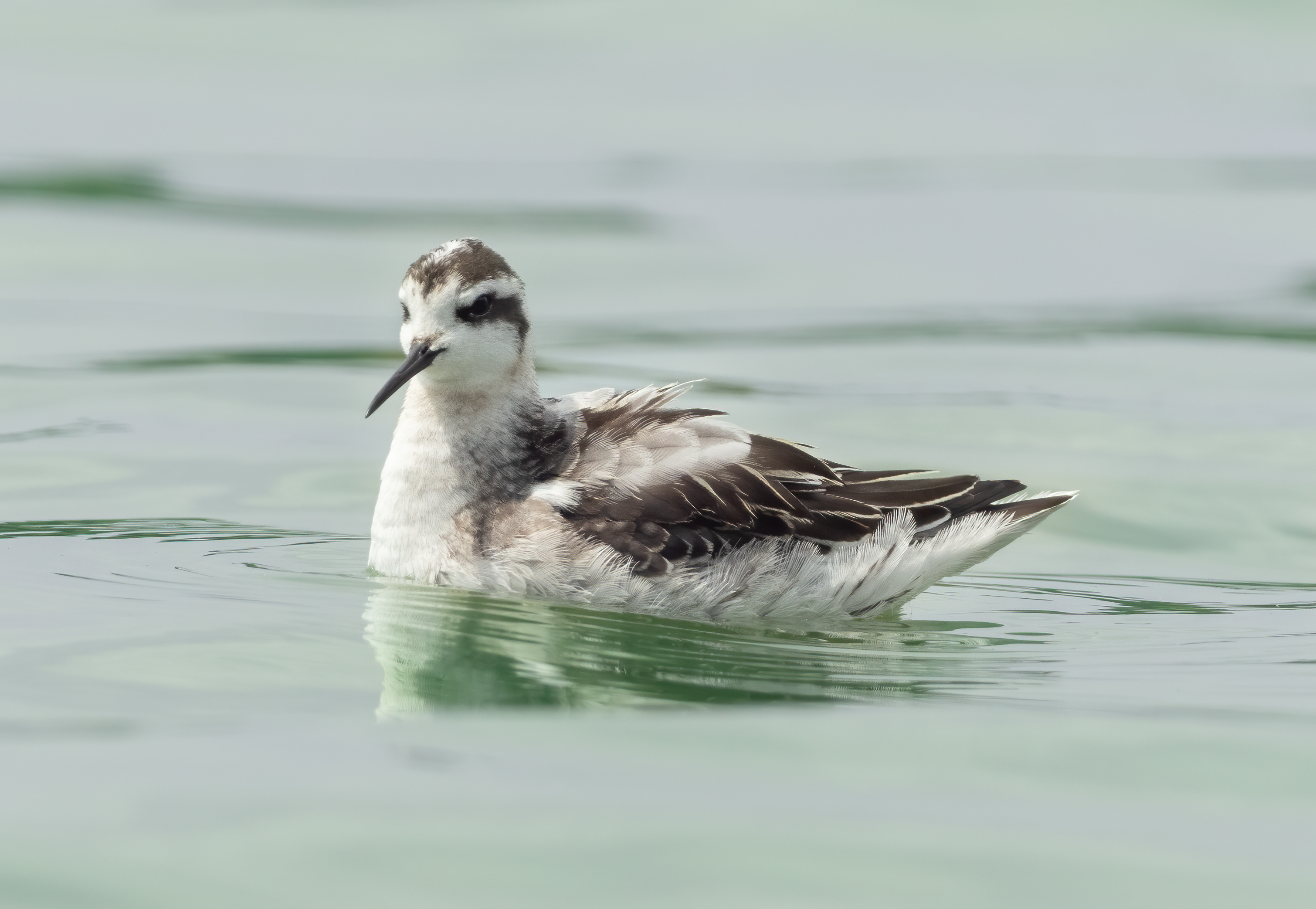
A red-necked phalarope, a planktivorous bird. These birds use water surface tension to snap plankton from the water column for consumption.

Planktivores, whether obligate or facultative, obtain food in multiple ways. Particulate feeders eat planktonic items selectively, by identifying plankton and pursuing them in the water column. Filter feeders process large volumes of water internally via different mechanisms, explained below, and strain food items out en masse or remove food particles from water as it passes by. "Tow-net" filter feeders swim rapidly with mouths open to filter the water, whereas "pumping" filter feeders suck in water via pumping actions. The charismatic flamingo is a pumping filter feeder, using its muscular tongue to pump water along specialized grooves in its bill and pump water back out once plankton have been retrieved. In a different filter feeding process, stationary animals, like corals, use their tentacles to grab plankton particles out of the water column and transfer the particles into their mouth. There are numerous interesting adaptations to remove plankton from the water column. The phalaropes use surface tension feeding to transport particles of prey to their mouth to be swallowed. These birds capture individual particles of plankton held in a droplet of water, suspended in their beaks. They then use a sequence of actions that begin with a quick opening of their beak to increase the surface area of the water droplet encasing prey. The action of stretching out the water droplet ultimately pushes the water and prey to the back of the throat where it can be consumed. These birds also spin around at the water surface, creating their own eddies that draw prey up closer to their beaks.

Some species actively hunt plankton: in certain habitats such as the deep open ocean, as mentioned above, the planktivorous basking shark (Cetorhinus maximus) track the movements of their prey closely up and down the water column. The megamouth shark (Megachasma pelagios), another planktivorous species, adopts a similar feeding strategy that mirrors the movement in the water column of their planktonic prey. Similar to active hunting, some zooplankton, like copepods, are ambush hunters meaning they wait in the water column for prey to come within range and then rapidly attack and consume. Some fishes change their feeding strategy throughout their lives; the Atlantic menhaden (Brevoortia tyrannus) is an obligate filter feeder in early life stages, but matures into a particulate feeder. Some fishes, like the northern anchovy (Engraulis mordax) can merely modify their feeding behavior depending on the prey or environmental conditions. Some fishes also school together when feeding to help improve contact rates of plankton and simultaneously prevent themselves from predation. Some fishes have gill rakes, an internal filtration structure that assists fishes with capturing plankton prey. The amount of gill rakes can indicate planktivory as well as the typical size of plankton consumed, showing a correlation between gill rake structure and the consumed plankton type.

== Nutritional value of plankton ==
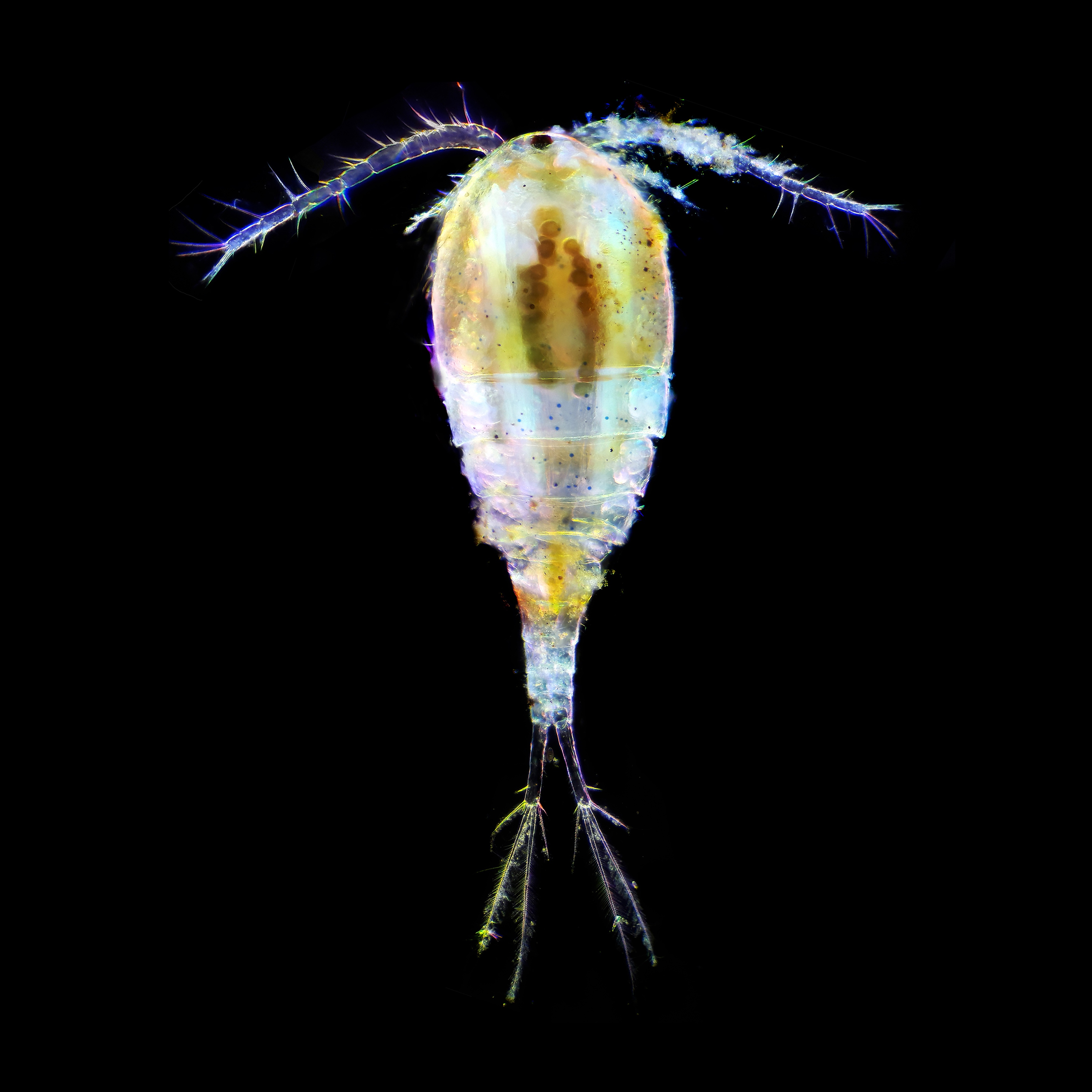
A copepod. These zooplankton are good sources of lipids for many planktivores like fishes.

Plankton have highly variable chemical compositions, which impacts their nutritional quality as a food source. Scientists are still understanding how nutritional quality varies with the type of plankton; for example diatom nutritional quality is a controversial topic. The ratios of phosphorus and nitrogen to carbon within a given plankton determine its nutritional quality. More carbon in an organism relative to these two elements decreases the plankton's nutritional value. Additionally, plankton with higher amounts of polyunsaturated fatty acids are typically more energy dense.

The nutritional value of plankton does sometimes depend on the nutritional needs of the planktivorous species. For fishes, the nutritional value of plankton is dependent on docosahexaenoic acid, long-chain polyunsaturated fatty acids, arachidonic acid, and eicosapentaenoic acid with higher concentrations of those chemicals leading to higher nutritional value. However, lipids in plankton prey are not the only required chemical for larval fish; Malzahn et al. found that other nutrients, like phosphorus, were necessary before growth improvements due to lipid concentrations can be realized. Additionally, it has been shown experimentally that the nutritional value of prey is more important than prey abundance for larval fishes. With climate change, plankton may decrease in nutritional quality. Lau et al. discovered that warming conditions and inorganic nutrient depletion in lakes as a result of climate change decreased the nutritional value of plankton communities.

== Planktivory across ecological systems ==
=== Ancient systems ===
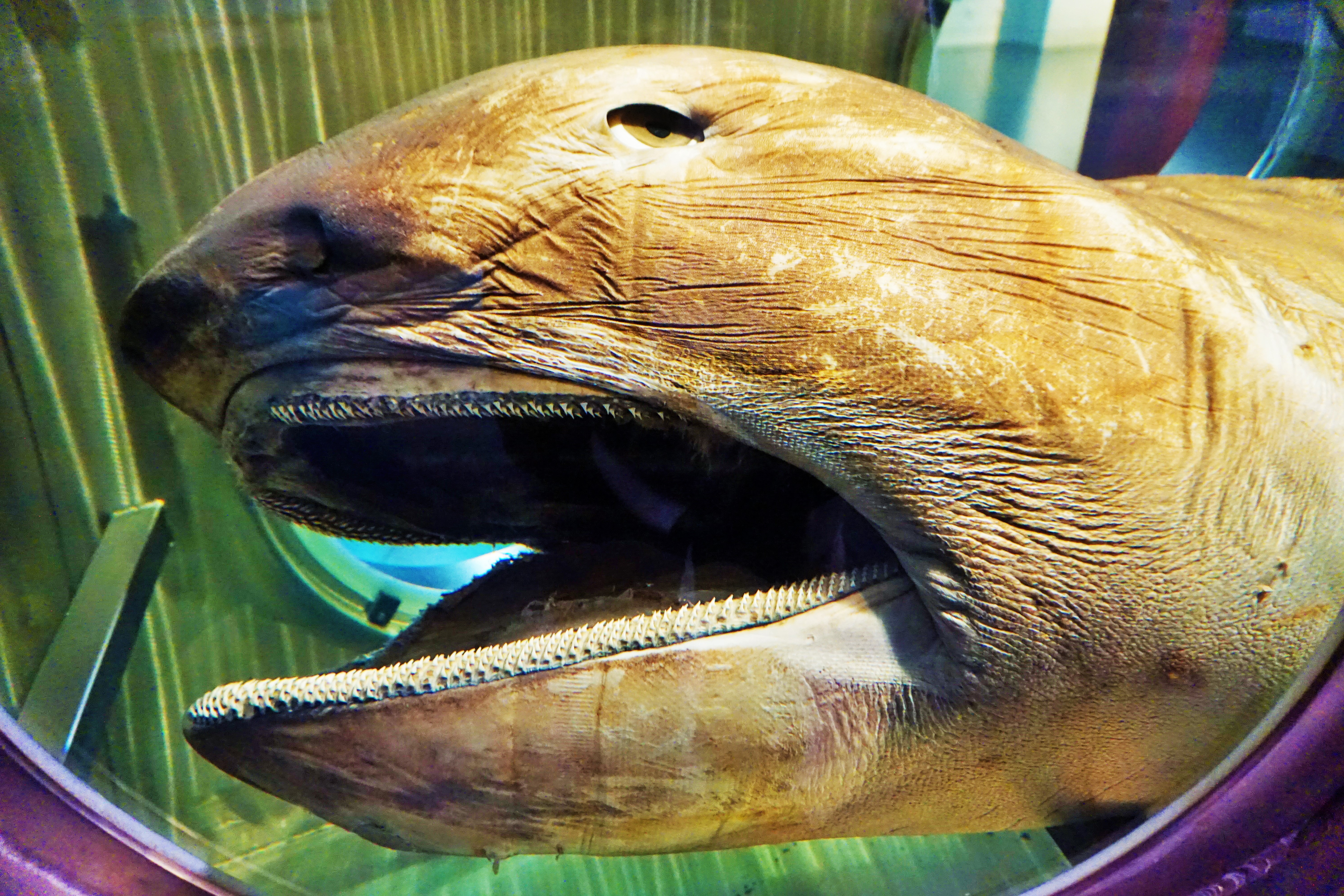
The head of a megamouth shark (Megachasma pelagios) with its teeth, specialized for filter-feeding on plankton, clearly shown

Planktivory is a common feeding strategy among some of our planet's largest organisms in both the present and the past. Massive Mesozoic organisms like pachycormids have recently been identified as planktivores; some individuals of this group reached lengths upwards of 9 feet. Scientists also recently discovered the fossilized remains of another ancient organism, which they named the "false megamouth" (Pseudomegachasma) shark, and which was likely a filter-feeding planktivore during the Cretaceous period. This new discovery illuminated planktivory as an example of convergent evolution, whereby distinct lineages evolved to fulfill similar dietary niches. In other words, the false megamouth and its planktivory evolved separate from the ancestors of present-day shark planktivores like the megamouth shark, whale shark, and basking shark, all mentioned above.

=== Arctic systems ===
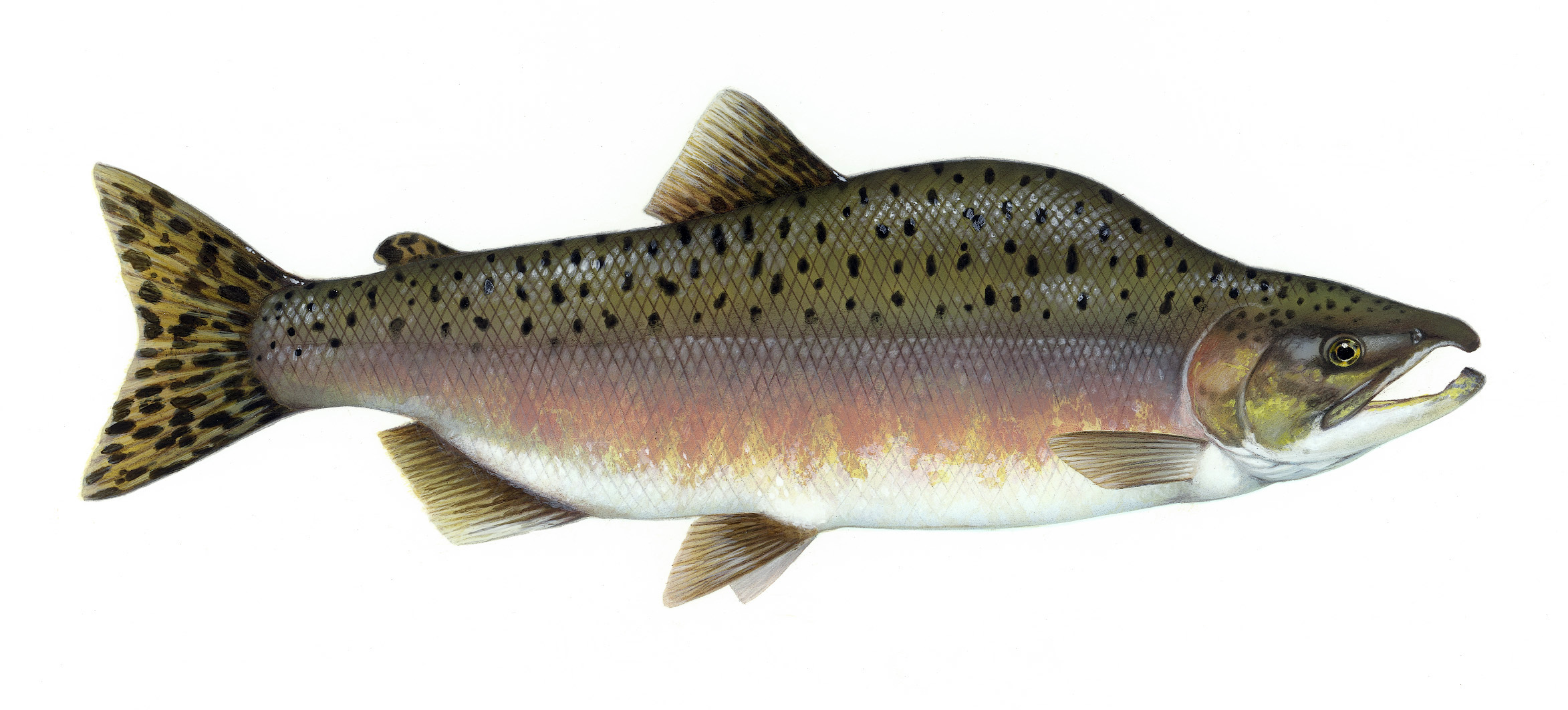
The planktivorous pink salmon, an important component of the Arctic ecosystem

The Arctic supports productive ecosystems that include many types of planktivorous species. Planktivorous pink salmon are common in the Arctic and the Bering Strait and have been suggested to exert significant control on structuring the phytoplankton and zooplankton dynamics in the subarctic North Pacific. Shifts in prey type have also been observed: in northern Arctic regions, salmon are typically piscivorous (consuming other fish) while in the southern Arctic and Bering Strait they are planktivorous. Capelin, Mallotus villosus, are also distributed across much of the Arctic and can exert significant control on zooplankton populations as a result of their planktivorous diet. Capelin have also been seen to exhibit cannibalism on their eggs when other types of preferred plankton sources become less available; alternatively, this behavior may be because increased spawning leads to more eggs in the environment for consumption. Arctic cod are also important zooplankton consumers and appear to follow aggregations of zooplankton around the region. Planktivorous birds like the fork-tailed storm-petrel and many types of auklets are also very common in the Arctic. Little auks are the most common Arctic planktivore species; as they reproduce on land, their planktivory creates an important link between marine and terrestrial nutrient reserves. This link is formed as little auks consume plankton with marine-derived nutrients at sea, then deposit nutrient-rich waste products on land during their reproductive process.

=== Temperate and sub-arctic systems ===
In freshwater lake systems, planktivory can be an important forcer of trophic cascades which can ultimately affect phytoplankton production. Fishes, in these systems, can promote phytoplankton productivity by preying on the zooplankton that control phytoplankton abundances. This is an example of top-down trophic control, where higher trophic organisms like fishes impose control on the abundance of lower trophic organisms, like phytoplankton. Such control on primary production via planktivorous organisms can be important in the functioning of mid-western United States lake systems. Fishes are often the most impactful zooplankton predators, as seen in Newfoundland where three-spine stickleback (Gasterosteus aculeatus) predate heavily upon zooplankton. In temperate lakes, the cyprinid and centrarchid fish families are commonly represented among the planktivore community. Planktivores can exert significant competition pressure on organisms in certain lake systems; for instance, in an Idaho lake the introduced planktivorous invertebrate shrimp Mysis relicta competes with the native landlocked planktivorous salmon kokanees. Because of the salmon's importance in trophic cycling, the loss of fishes in temperate lake systems could lead to widespread ecological consequences; in this example, such a loss could lead to unchecked predation on plankton by Mysis relicta. Planktivory can also be important in man-made reservoirs. In contrast to deeper and colder natural lakes, reservoirs are warmer, shallower, heavily modified human made systems with different ecosystem dynamics. Gizzard shad, the previously mentioned obligate planktivore, is frequently the most common fish in many reservoir systems.

In certain sub-Arctic habitats like deep waters, the planktivorous basking shark tracks the movements of their prey closely up and down the water column in deep waters. Other species like the megamouth shark adopt a similar feeding strategy that mirrors movement in the water column of their plankton prey. In sub-Arctic lakes, certain morphs of the whitefish (Coregonus lavaretus) are planktivorous; the pelagic whitefish feeds primarily on zooplankton and as such have more gill rakers for enhanced feeding than other, non-planktivorous morphs of the same species.

==== Nutrient limitation in lake systems ====
The primary limiting nutrient shifts between nitrogen and phosphorus; a resulting consequence of changes in the structure of the food-web, thus limiting primary and secondary production in aquatic ecosystems. The bioavailability of such nutrients drives variation in the biomass and productivity of planktonic species. Due to variance in the N:P excretion of planktivorous fish species, consumer-driven nutrient cycling results in changes in nutrient availability. By feeding on zooplankton, planktivorous fish can increase the rate of nutrient recycling by releasing phosphorus from their prey. Planktivorous fish may release cyanobacteria from nutrient limitation by increasing the concentration of bioavailable phosphorus through excretion. The presence of planktivorous fish can disturb sediments, resulting in an increase in the amount of nutrients that are bioavailable to phytoplankton and further support in phytoplankton nutrient demands.

== Planktivore effects on a global scale ==
=== Trophic regulation ===
Planktivory can play an important role in the growth, abundance, and community composition of planktonic species via top-down trophic control. For example, competitive superiority of large zooplankton over smaller species in lake systems leads to large-body dominance in the absence of planktivorous fish as a result of increased food availability and grazing efficiency. Alternatively, the presence of planktivorous fish results in a decrease in zooplankton population through predation and shifts the community composition towards smaller zooplankton by limiting food availability and influencing size-selective predation (see the "predation" page for more information regarding size-selective predation). Predation by planktivorous fish reduces grazing by zooplankton and subsequently increases phytoplankton primary production and biomass. By limiting the population and growth rate of zooplankton, obligate zooplanktivores are less likely to migrate to the area due to the lack of available food. For example, the presence of gizzard shad in reservoirs has been observed to strongly influence the recruitment of other planktivores. Variations of fish recruitment and mortality rates from nutrient limitation have also been noted in lake ecosystems.

Piscivory can have similar top-down effects on planktonic species by influencing the community composition of planktivores. The population of planktivorous fish can also be influenced through predation by piscivorous species such as marine mammals and aquatic birds. For example, planktivorous minnows in Lake Gatun experienced a rapid population decline after the introduction of peacock bass (Cichla ocellaris). However, a reduced population of planktivorous fish species result in a population increase of another class of planktivores – zooplankton. In lake ecosystems, some fish have been observed to behave first as zooplanktivores then as piscivores, affecting cascading trophic interactions.

Planktivory pressure from zooplankton in marine communities (top-down control, as previously mentioned)has a large influence on phytoplankton productivity. Zooplankton can control phytoplankton seasonal dynamics as they exert the largest grazing pressure on phytoplankton; they also may modify their grazing strategies depending on environmental conditions, leading to seasonal change. For instance, copepods can switch between ambushing prey and using water flow to capture prey depending on external conditions and prey abundance. The planktivorous pressure zooplankton exert could explain the diversity of phytoplankton despite many phytoplankton occupying similar ecological niches (see the "paradox of the plankton" page for more information regarding this ecological conundrum).

One notable example of trophic control is how planktivores have the ability to impact the species distribution of larval crabs in estuaries and coastal waters. Crab larvae, which are also planktivores, are hatched inside estuaries but some species then begin their migration out to waters along the coast where there are not as many predators. These crab larvae then utilize the tides to return to the estuaries when they become benthic organisms and are no longer planktivores. Planktivores tend to live their early lives within estuaries. These juvenile fish tend to inhabit these regions throughout the warmer months in the year. Throughout the year, the risk for plankton varies within estuaries, the risk reaches its highest from August to October, and the lowest from December to April, this is consistent with the theory that planktivory is the highest in the summer months in this system. The risk of planktivory is strongly correlated with the number of planktivores within this system.

=== Nutrient transport ===
Consumers can regulate primary production in an ecosystem by altering ratios of nutrients via different rates of recycling. Nutrient transport is greatly influenced by planktivorous fish, which recycle and transport nutrients between benthic and pelagic habitats. Nutrients released by benthic-feeding fishes can increase the total nutrient content of pelagic waters, as transported nutrients are fundamentally different from those that are recycled. Additionally, planktivorous fish can have significant effect on nutrient transport as well as total nutrient concentration by disturbing sediments through bioturbation. Increased nutrient cycling from near-sediment bioturbation by filter-feeding planktivores can increase phytoplankton population via nutrient enrichment. Salmon accumulate marine nutrients as they mature in ocean environments which they then transport back to their stream of origin to spawn. As they decompose, the freshwater streams become enriched with nutrients which contribute to the development of the ecosystem.

The physical transport of nutrients and plankton can greatly affect the community composition and food web structure within oceanic ecosystems. In nearshore regions, planktivores and piscivores have been shown to be highly sensitive to changes in ocean currents while zooplankton populations are unable to tainted levels of predation pressure.

=== Planktivore modification on plankton growth ===
In some marine systems, planktivory can be an important factor controlling the duration and extent of phytoplankton blooms. Changes in phytoplankton communities and growth rates can modify the amount of grazing pressure present; grazing pressure can also be dampened by physical factors in the water column. The scientist Michael Behrenfeld proposed that the deepening of the mixed layer in the ocean, a vertical region near the surface made physically and chemically homogenous by active mixing, leads to a decrease in grazing interactions among planktivores and plankton because planktivores and plankton become more spatially distant from one another. This spatial distance thereby facilitates phytoplankton blooms and ultimately grazing rates by planktivores; both the physical changes and changes to grazing pressure have a significant influence on where and when phytoplankton blooms occur. The shallowing of the mixed layer due to physical processes within the water column conversely intensifies planktivore feeding.

==== Harmful algal blooms ====
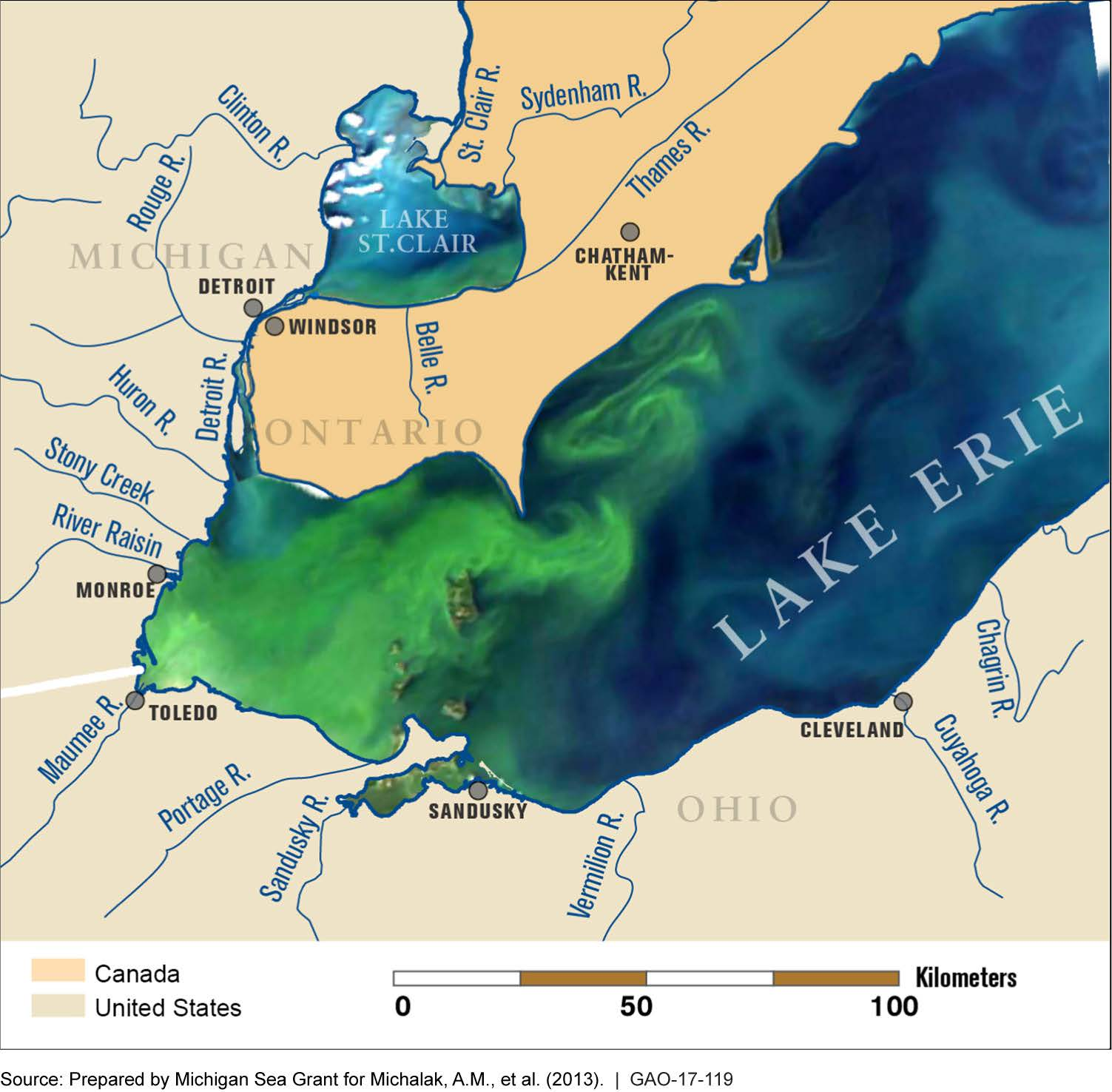
Satellite image of a harmful algal bloom in Lake Erie, United States. The green color in the water is algae, in such quantities that the bloom can be seen from space.

Harmful algal blooms occur when there is a bloom of toxin producing phytoplankton. Planktivores such as fish and filter feeders that are present have a high likelihood of consuming these phytoplankton because that is what makes up the majority of their diet, or the diet of their prey. Since these planktivores near the bottom of the food chain consume harmful toxins, those toxins then move up the food web when predators consume these fish. The increasing concentration of some toxins through trophic levels presented here is called bioaccumulation, and this can lead to a range of impacts from non-lethal changes in behavior to major die-offs of large marine animals. There are monitoring programs in place for shellfish due to human health concerns and the ease of sampling in oysters. Some fish feed directly on phytoplankton, like the Atlantic herring (Clupea harengus), and Clupeidae, while other fish feed on zooplankton that consume the harmful algae. Domoic acid is a toxin carried by a type of diatom called Pseudo-nitzschia. Pseudo-nitzchia were the main organism responsible for a large HAB that took place along the west coast of the US in 2015 and had a large impact on the Dungeness crab fishery that year. When harmful algal blooms occur, planktivorous fish can act as vectors for poisonous substances like domoic acid. These planktivorous fish are eaten by larger fish and birds and the subsequent ingestion of toxins can then harm those species. Those animals consume planktivorous fish during a harmful algal bloom, and can have miscarriages, seizures, vomiting, and can sometimes die. Additionally, marine mammal mortality is occasionally attributed to harmful algal blooms, according to NOAA.

Krill are another example of a planktivore that may exhibit high levels of domoic acid in their system; these large plankton are then consumed by humpback and blue whales. Since krill can have such a high level of domoic acid in their system when blooms are present, that concentration is rapidly transferred to whales which leads them to have a high concentration of domoic acid in their system as well. There is no evidence proving that this domoic acid has had a negative impact on the whales, but if the concentration of domoic acid is great enough, they could be impacted similarly to other marine mammals.

== The role of climate change ==
Climate change is a worldwide phenomenon that affects everything from the largest planktivores such as whales, to even the smallest plankton. Climate change affects weather patterns, creates seasonal anomalies, alters sea surface temperature, alters ocean currents, and can affect nutrient availability for phytoplankton, and may even spur HABs in some systems.

=== Arctic and Antarctic ===
A schematic of the component organisms in the Arctic marine food web. Planktivores shown here include blue whales, fish, crabs, and other plankton.

The Arctic has been hit hard with shorter winters and hotter summers creating less permafrost and rapidly melting ice caps causing lower salinity levels. The coupling of higher ocean CO_{2} levels, temperatures, and lower salinity is causing changes in phytoplankton communities and diatom diversity. Thalassiosira spp. Plankton was replaced by solitary Cylindrotheca closterium or Pseudo-nitzschia spp., a common HAB causing phytoplankton, under higher temperature and lower salinity in combination. Community changes such as this one, have large-scale effects through trophic levels. A shift in the primary producer communities can cause shifts in consumer communities, as the new food may provide different dietary benefits. As there is less permanent ice in the Arctic and less summer ice, some planktivores species are already moving north into these new open waters. Atlantic cod and orcas have been documented in these new territories, while planktivores such as Arctic cod are losing their habitat and feeding grounds under and around the sea ice. Similarly, the Arctic birds, the Least and Crested Auklets rely on zooplankton that lives under the disappearing sea ice and has seen dramatic effects on reproductive fitness and nutrition stress with the decreasing amounts of zooplankton available in the Bering Sea basin.

In another prime example of shifting food webs, Moore et al. (2018) have found a shift from benthic dominated ecosystem to a more pelagic dominated ecosystem feeding structure. With longer open water periods, due to a loss of sea ice the Chukchi Sea has seen a shift in the past three decades. The increase in air temperature and loss of sea ice have coupled to promote an increase in pelagic fishes and a decrease in benthic biomass. This shift has encouraged a shift to planktivorous seabirds instead of piscivorous seabirds.

Pollock fish are a planktivorous fish that rely on copepods as their primary diet as juveniles. According to the Oscillating Control Hypothesis, early ice retreat caused by a warming climate creates a later bloom of copepods and aphids (a plankton species). The later bloom produces fewer large lipid rich copepods, and results in smaller less nutrient rich copepods. The older pollock then face a winter starvation, causing carnivory on young pollock (<1yr old), and reduced population numbers and fitness.

Similar to the Arctic, sea ice in the Antarctic is melting rapidly and permanent ice is becoming less and less (Zachary Lab Cite). This ice melt creates changes in freshwater input and ocean stratification, consequently affecting nutrient delivery to primary producers. As sea ice recedes, there is less valuable surface area for algae to grow on the bottom of the ice. This lack of algae inhibits krill (a partial planktonic species) to have less food availability, consequently affecting the fitness of Antarctic primary consumers such as krill, squid, pollock, and other carnivorous zooplankton.

=== Subarctic ===
The Subarctic has seen similar ecosystem changes especially in well studied places such as Alaska. The warmer waters have helped increase zooplankton communities and have been creating a shift in ecosystem dynamics (Green 2017). There has been a large shift from piscivorous seabirds such as pacific loons and black-legged kittiwakes to planktivores sea birds such as ancient auklets and short-tailed shearwaters. Marine planktivores such as the charismatic humpback, fin, and minke whales have been benefiting from the increase in zooplankton such as an increase in krill. As these large whales spend more time migrating into these northern water, they are taking up resources previously only used by arctic planktivores, creating potential shifts in food availability and thus food webs.

=== Tropics ===
Tropical and equatorial marine regions are mainly characterized by coral reef communities or vast open oceans. Coral reefs are one of the most susceptible ecosystems to climate change, in particular the symptoms of warming oceans and acidification. Ocean acidification raises CO_{2} levels in the ocean and has significant effects on zooplankton communities. Smith et al. (2016) discovered that increased levels of CO_{2} show reductions in zooplankton biomass but not zooplankton quality in tropical ecosystems, as increased CO_{2} had no negative effects on fatty acid compositions. This means that planktivores are not receiving less nutritious zooplankton, but are experiencing lesser availability of zooplankton than is needed for survival.

One of the most important planktivores in the tropics are corals themselves. Although spending a portion of their life cycle as planktonic organisms themselves, established corals are sedentary organisms that can use their tentacles to capture plankton from the surrounding environment to help supplement energy produced by the photosynthetic zooxanthellae. Climate change has had significant impacts on coral reefs, with warming causing coral bleaching and increases in infectious diseases, sea-level rise causing more sedimentation that then smothers corals, stronger and more frequent storms causing breakage and structural destruction, an increase of land runoff bringing more nutrients into the systems causing algal blooms that murk up the water and therefore diminish light availability for photosynthesis, altered ocean currents causing a difference in the dispersal of larvae and planktonic food availability, and lastly changes in ocean pH decreasing structural integrity and growth rates.

There is also a plethora of planktivorous fish throughout the tropics that play important ecological roles within marine systems. Similar to corals, planktivorous reef fish are directly affected by these changing systems and these negative effects then disrupt food webs through the oceans. As plankton communities shift in speciation and availability, primary consumers have a harder time meeting energy budgets. This lack of food availability can influence reproductivity and overall primary consumer populations, creating food shortages for higher trophic consumers.

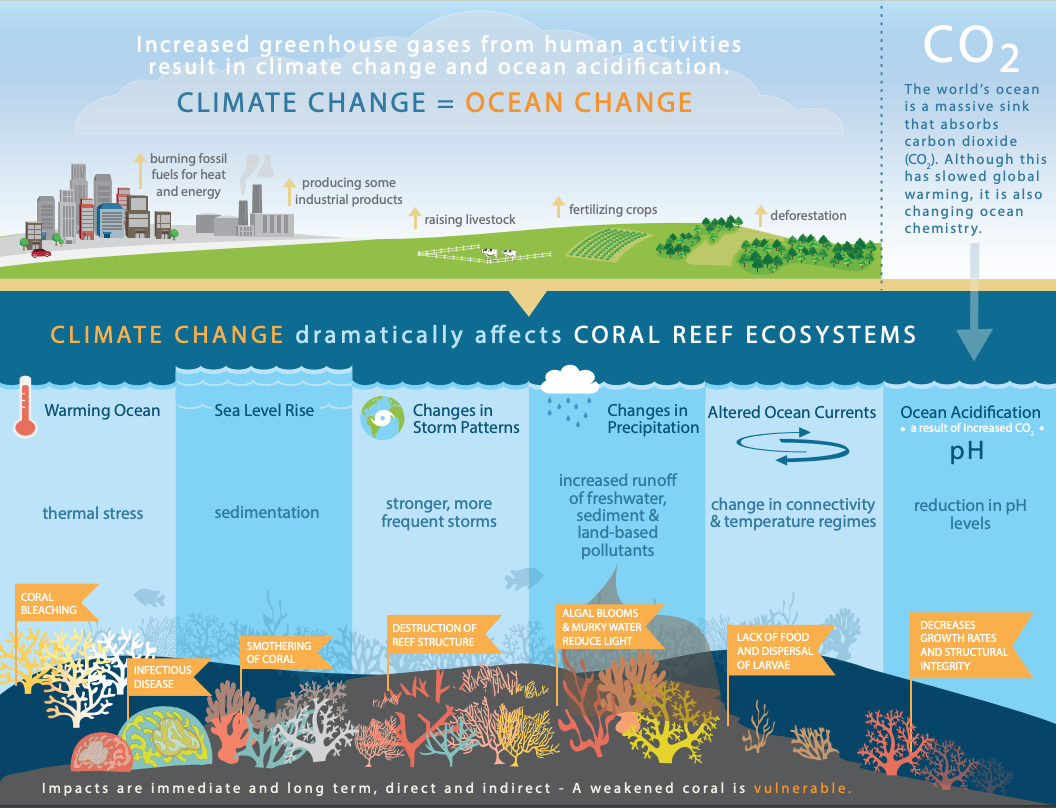
A visual representation of the threats climate change imposes on tropical coral reef ecosystems

== Effects of planktivores on industry ==
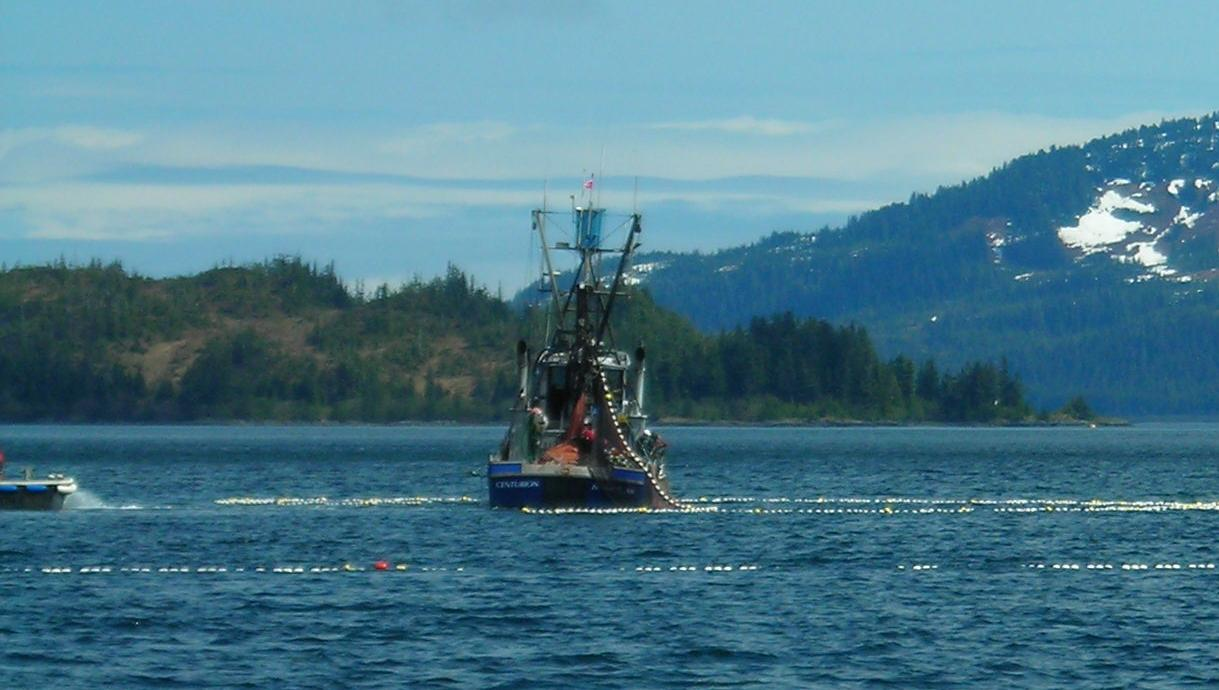
A fishing boat using a seine (a type of net) to fish for salmon in Prince William Sound, United States

The global fisheries industry is a multi-billion dollar, international industry that provides food and livelihoods to billions of people around the globe. Some of the most important fisheries include salmon, pollock, mackerel, char, cod, halibut, and trout. In 2021, the take home total profits, before bonuses, actually going into fishermen's pockets, from the Alaskan salmon, cod, flounder, and groundfish fishing season came to $248 million. Planktivorous fish alone create an important, large economic industry. In 2017 Alaska pollock was the United States' largest commercial fishery by volume with 3.4 billion pounds being caught and coming in at total value of $413 million.

Besides fishing, planktivorous marine animals drive tourism economy as well. Tourist travel across the world for whale watching, to see charismatic megafauna such as humpback whales in Hawaii, Minke whales in Alaska, grey whales in Oregon, and whale sharks in South America. Manta rays also drive dive and snorkel tourism, raking in over $73 million annually, in direct revenue, over 23 countries around the world. The main participating countries in Manta ray tourism include Japan, Indonesia, the Maldives, Mozambique, Thailand, Australia, Mexico, United States, Federated States of Micronesia and Palau.

== See also ==
- Zooplankton
- Plankton
- Piscivore
- Phytoplankton
- Filter feeder
- Carnivore
