= Imitomyia hungarica =

Scientific classification
- Kingdom: Animalia
- Phylum: Arthropoda
- Class: Insecta
- Order: Diptera
- Family: Tachinidae
- Subfamily: Dexiinae
- Tribe: Imitomyiini
- Genus: Imitomyia
- Species: I. hungarica

Binomial name
- Imitomyia hungarica (Thalhammer, 1897)

Synonyms
- Himantostoma hungarica Thalhammer, 1897

Species of fly

Imitomyia hungarica is a species of fly in the family Tachinidae. Found in Hungary, it was described as a new species in 1897 by the Hungarian entomologist János Thalhammer.

== Description ==
Imitomyia hungarica is a dipteran species (true fly) measuring 3 mm in length, with a black, opaque body. The thorax (middle body segment) is lightly dusted with ash-grey pollinosity (a fine, powdery coating), while the abdomen (rear body segment) is flattened and densely covered with black hairs and a thicker coating of ash-grey pollinosity.

The eyes are bare (lacking hair) and nearly touching at the top of the head. The frontal stripe is black, thread-like at the vertex (top of the head). The orbital areas are whitish-grey, and the face is bare and black below the middle, with a small bump. The cheeks are hairy, and the mouth opening is fringed with longer hairs. The proboscis (feeding appendage) is long, slender, and jointed twice.

The wings are hyaline (transparent and glassy). The fourth longitudinal vein is curved but lacks an appendage. The veins show distinctive characteristics: the marginal vein extends to the tip of the third longitudinal vein; the transverse middle vein is positioned below the tip of the first longitudinal vein and is more distant from the base than from the tip of the discal cell; the posterior transverse vein is closer to the apex of the posterior first cell than to its base.

The legs are sparsely covered with hairs. The antennae are black, with the third segment four times longer than the second, bearing a black seta (bristle) that is barely pubescent (covered with fine hairs). The halters (small knobbed structures behind the wings that help with balance) are brown, and the scales are white.

The thorax and scutellum(small plate behind the thorax) are black with very fine dust. The scutellum has four slightly stronger bristles on its margin and apex.

== Distribution ==
Imitomyia hungarica is known from Hungary, with the type specimen collected in Apaj, Pest County. This locality is situated in central Hungary within the Pannonian biogeographical region, characterized by its continental climate and lowland plains. The original specimen was collected by Kálmán Kertész.
