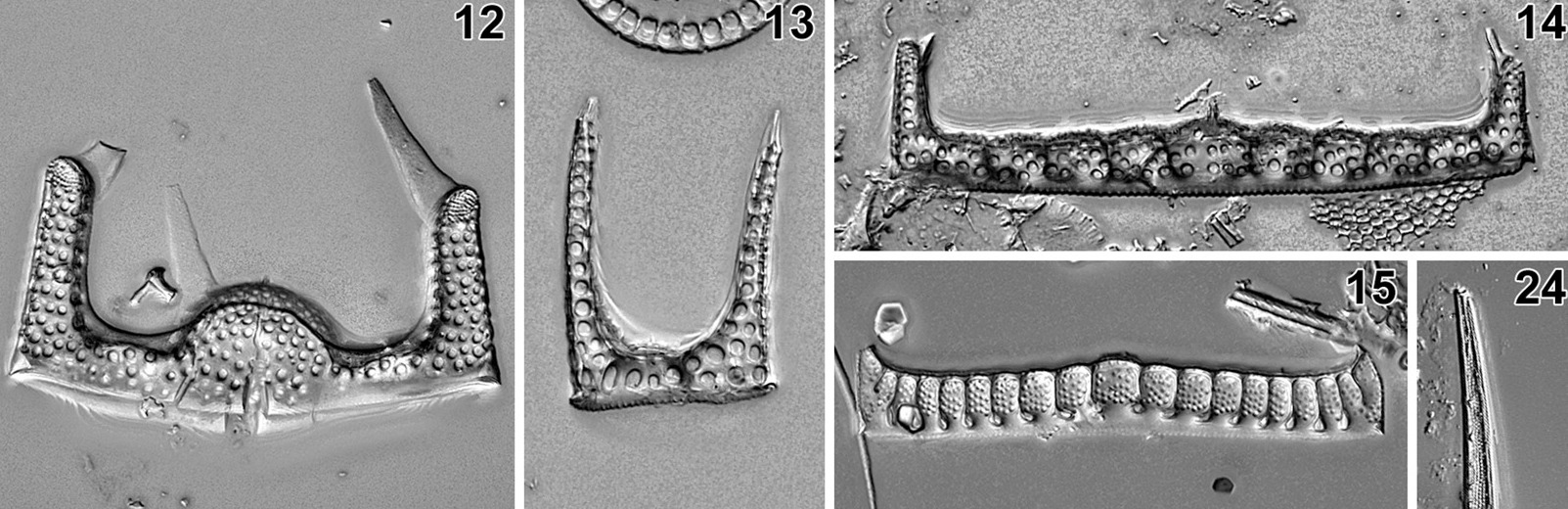
- Hemiaulus immanis (12), H. mesolepta (13) and H. crenatus (14 and 15)

Scientific classification
- Domain: Eukaryota
- Clade: Sar
- Clade: Stramenopiles
- Division: Ochrophyta
- Clade: Bacillariophyta
- Class: Thalassiosirophyceae
- Subclass: Chaetocerotophycidae
- Order: Hemiaulales
- Family: Hemiaulaceae; Heiberg

Genera
- †Abas †Ailuretta †Baxteriopsis †Briggera; Cerataulina; Climacodium; Eucampia †Fennerbicornis; Hemiaulus †Keratophora †Kittonia †Pseudorutilaria †Rymariopsis †Sphynctolethus †Strelnikovia †Trinacria †Williamriedelia

= Hemiaulaceae =

Family of single-celled organisms

Hemiaulaceae is a diatom family. Species live between -1.86 and 29.47 degrees Celsius and at depths of up to 2010 meters.
