= Imitomyia sugens =

Scientific classification
- Kingdom: Animalia
- Phylum: Arthropoda
- Class: Insecta
- Order: Diptera
- Family: Tachinidae
- Subfamily: Dexiinae
- Tribe: Imitomyiini
- Genus: Imitomyia
- Species: I. sugens

Binomial name
- Imitomyia sugens (Loew, 1863)

Synonyms
- Himantostoma sugens Loew, 1863; Saskatchewania canadensis Smith, 1915

Species of fly

Imitomyia sugens is a species of fly in the family Tachinidae.

== Distribution ==
Canada, United States.
