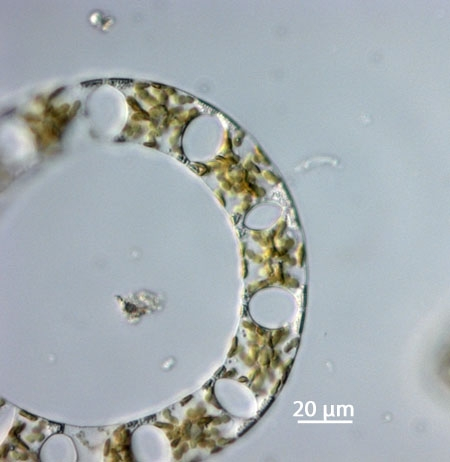
- Eucampia zodiacus

Scientific classification
- Domain: Eukaryota
- Clade: Sar
- Clade: Stramenopiles
- Division: Ochrophyta
- Clade: Bacillariophyta
- Class: Thalassiosirophyceae
- Order: Eucampiales
- Genus: Eucampia
- Species: E. zodiacus

Binomial name
- Eucampia zodiacus Ehrenberg

= Eucampia zodiacus =

Species of single-celled organism

Eucampia zodiacus is a common marine centric diatom species. It is known to be cosmopolitan except in polar regions. E. zodiacus is a harmful diatom that has become known as the predominant organisms causing the bleaching of aqua-cultured nori seaweed (Pyropia yezonesis).

== Description ==
The E. zodiacus cell has an average size between 10-61 μm along the apical axis. The cell wall is silicified, as is characteristic of all diatoms. The thickness of this cell wall changes with season. Cells are flattened and interlock by two apical elevations (horns) to form long curved colony formations. Consist of discoid plastids, bipolar frustules with elliptical valve face. Aperture shape is one of the identifying morphological features.

== Distribution ==
Eucampia zodiacus is very widely distributed in south temperate regions of warmer waters. It has been found to be abundant off southern California and common as far north as Alaska. Since the mid 1990s E. zodiacus blooms have been frequently detected off the coast of Japan during winter months through early spring. This is a period of strong vertical mixing. Its blooms have caused the exhaustion of nutrients in the water column during the nori seaweed harvest season.
