= Proriedelia =

Scientific classification
- Kingdom: Animalia
- Phylum: Arthropoda
- Class: Insecta
- Order: Diptera
- Family: Tachinidae
- Subfamily: Dexiinae
- Tribe: Imitomyiini
- Genus: Proriedelia; Mesnil, 1953

Type species
- Proriedelia petiolata Mesnil, 1953

Genus of flies

Proriedelia is a genus of flies in the family Tachinidae.

== Species ==
- Proriedelia petiolata Mesnil, 1953

== Distribution ==
Myanmar.
