= Imitomyia =

Scientific classification
- Kingdom: Animalia
- Phylum: Arthropoda
- Class: Insecta
- Order: Diptera
- Family: Tachinidae
- Subfamily: Dexiinae
- Tribe: Imitomyiini
- Genus: Imitomyia; Townsend, 1912

Type species
- Himantostoma sugens Loew, 1863

Synonyms
- Himantostoma Loew, 1863; Saskatchewania Smith, 1915; Diplopota Bezzi, 1918; Himantostomopsis Townsend, 1921; Imitelfa Richter, 1976

Genus of flies

Imitomyia is a genus of bristle flies in the family Tachinidae.

== Species ==
- Imitomyia hungarica (Thalhammer, 1897)
- Imitomyia kivuensis Verbeke, 19622
- Imitomyia mica Richter, 1976
- Imitomyia mochii (Bezzi, 1917)
- Imitomyia nitida (Emden, 1945)
- Imitomyia sugens (Loew, 1863)
