= Briggera =

Briggera Temporal range: upper Cretaceous-Lower Miocene, 100–15.97 Ma

Scientific classification
- Domain: Eukaryota
- Clade: Sar
- Clade: Stramenopiles
- Division: Ochrophyta
- Clade: Bacillariophyta
- Class: Thalassiosirophyceae
- Order: Hemiaulales
- Family: Hemiaulaceae
- Genus: †Briggera; R. Ross & P.A. Sims, 1985

Extinct genus of single-celled organisms

Briggera is an extinct genus of diatom known from the fossil record.

== Species ==
- Briggera affixa (R.Ross) R.Ross & P.A.Sims, 1985
- Briggera capitata (R.K.Greville) R.Ross & P.A.Sims, 1985
