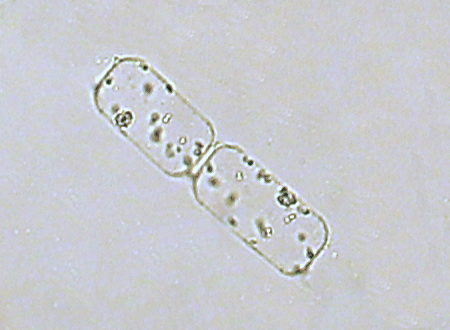
- Cerataulina pelagica

Scientific classification
- Domain: Eukaryota
- Clade: Sar
- Clade: Stramenopiles
- Division: Ochrophyta
- Clade: Diatomeae
- Class: Mediophyceae
- Order: Hemiaulales
- Family: Hemiaulaceae
- Genus: Cerataulina; H. Peragallo ex F. Schütt in Engler & Prantl

Species
- Cerataulina bergonii Cerataulina bicornis Cerataulina chapmanii Cerataulina compacta Cerataulina cretaceae Cerataulina curvata Cerataulina daemon Cerataulina dentata

= Cerataulina =

Genus of single-celled organisms

Cerataulina is a diatom genus. Cerataulina is similar to another genus of the family Hemiaulaceae, Eucampia. Cerataulina inhabits coastlines and estuaries. Cerataulina was originally classified as Syringigium in 1980 by Hasle & Syvertsen.
