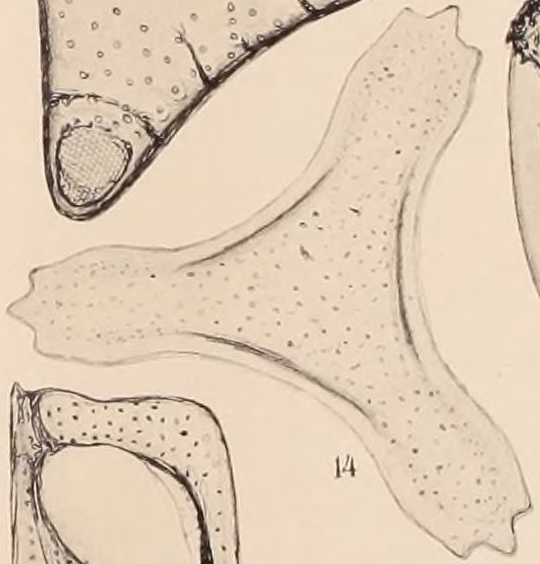
- Trinacria simulacrum

Scientific classification
- Domain: Eukaryota
- Clade: Sar
- Clade: Stramenopiles
- Division: Ochrophyta
- Clade: Bacillariophyta
- Class: Thalassiosirophyceae
- Order: Hemiaulales
- Family: Hemiaulaceae
- Genus: †Trinacria; Heiberg (1863)

Species
- Trinacria acuminata; Trinacria altar; Trinacria anisimovae; Trinacria antiqua; Trinacria aries; Trinacria barronii; Trinacria cancellata; Trinacria caudata; Trinacria chenevierei; Trinacria conifera; Trinacria cornuta; Trinacria coronata; Trinacria cristata; Trinacria deciusi; Trinacria deciusii; Trinacria ecostata; Trinacria excavata; Trinacria exsculpta; Trinacria fimbriata; Trinacria fragilis; Trinacria grevillei; Trinacria grunowii; Trinacria heibergii; Trinacria hystrix; Trinacria indefinita; Trinacria insipiens; Trinacria insolita; Trinacria interlineata; Trinacria jeremiae; Trinacria jordanii; Trinacria kittoniana; Trinacria lecointei; Trinacria limpida; Trinacria lingulata; Trinacria media; Trinacria mertzii; Trinacria mucronata; Trinacria muelleri; Trinacria nitescens; Trinacria pachtii; Trinacria palmipes; Trinacria pantocsekii; Trinacria paradoxa; Trinacria pileolus; Trinacria praecellens; Trinacria praetenuis; Trinacria princeps; Trinacria racovitzae f. excavata; Trinacria racovitzae; Trinacria regina; Trinacria rossica; Trinacria semseyi; Trinacria senta; Trinacria simulacroides; Trinacria simulacrum; Trinacria sparsa; Trinacria subcapitata; Trinacria subcapitata; Trinacria subcoronata; Trinacria tessela; Trinacria tripedalis; Trinacria tristictia; Trinacria tschestnovii; Trinacria venosa f. major; Trinacria venosa; Trinacria ventricosa; Trinacria vetustissima; Trinacria weissflogii; Trinacria wittii

= Trinacria (diatom) =

Trinacria Temporal range: Early Eocene, 59.2–56 Ma

Extinct genus of single-celled organisms

Trinacria is an extinct genus of diatoms present during the early Eocene, named for its triskelion shape.

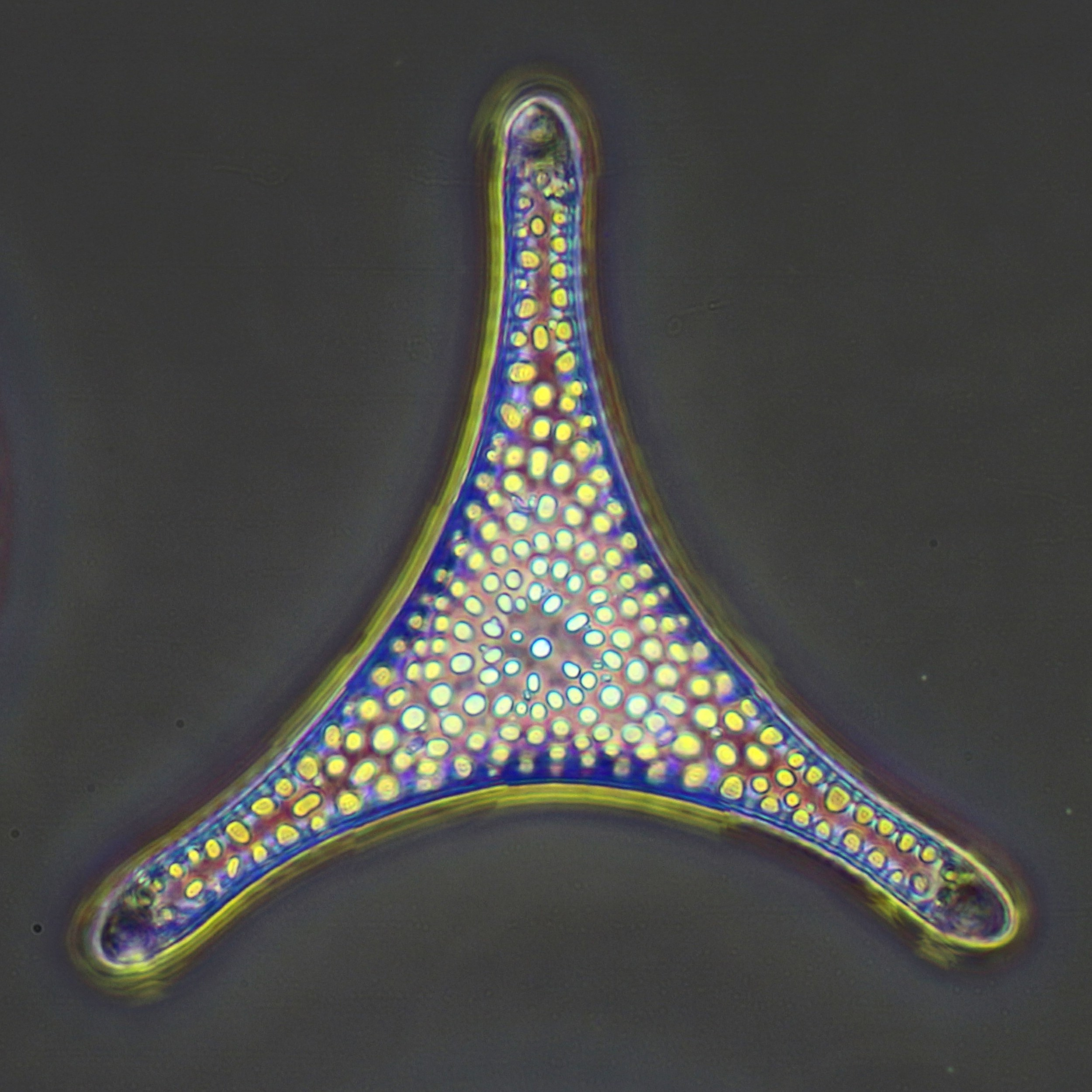
Fossilized shell of Trinacria aries

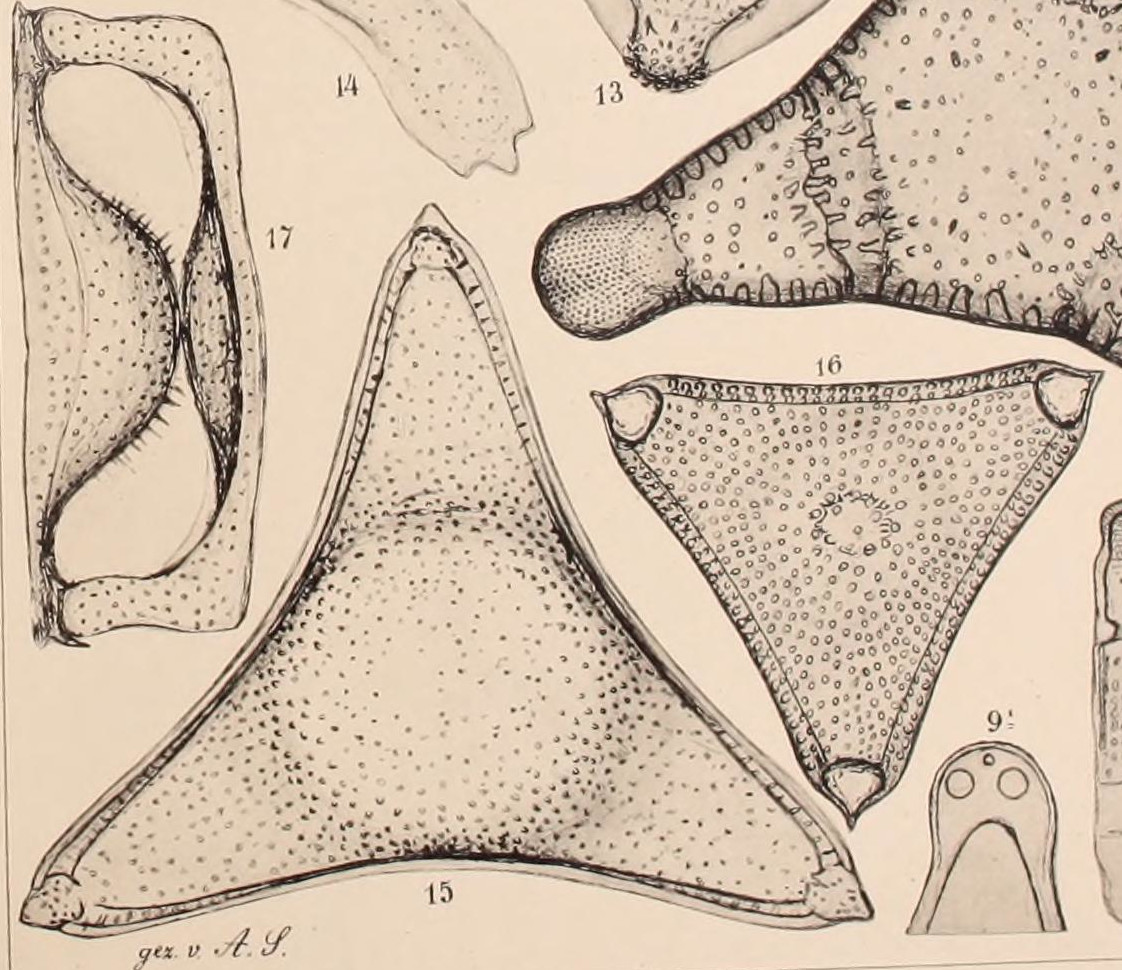
Trinacria ventricosa
