= Fennerbicornis =

Scientific classification
- Domain: Eukaryota
- Clade: Sar
- Clade: Stramenopiles
- Division: Ochrophyta
- Clade: Bacillariophyta
- Class: Thalassiosirophyceae
- Order: Hemiaulales
- Family: Hemiaulaceae
- Genus: †Fennerbicornis; Blanco, 2020

Species
- †Fennerbicornis incisus (Hajós) Blanco, 2020; †Fennerbicornis kittonii (Grunow) Blanco, 2020; †Fennerbicornis pyxilloides Blanco, 2020

Synonyms
- Bicornis J. Fenner, 1994

Extinct genus of single-celled organisms

Fennerbicornis is an extinct genus of diatoms with three known species.
