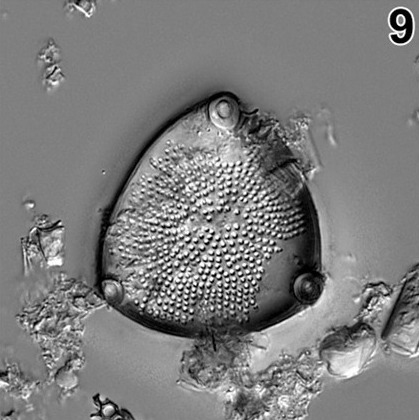
- Abas wittii specimen from the Eocene North Atlantic

Scientific classification
- Domain: Eukaryota
- Clade: Sar
- Clade: Stramenopiles
- Division: Ochrophyta
- Clade: Bacillariophyta
- Class: Thalassiosirophyceae
- Order: Hemiaulales
- Family: Hemiaulaceae
- Genus: †Abas; R.Ross & P.A.Sims, 1980
- Species: †A. wittii

Binomial name
- †Abas wittii (Grunow) R.Ross & P.A.Sims

= Abas wittii =

Abas wittii Temporal range: Eocene-Oligocene, 56–23 Ma

Extinct species of single-celled organism

Abas is an extinct genus of diatoms consisting of only one known species: Abas wittii. Originally observed as a fossil genus classified with diatom spore forms under the name Syringidium. Abas was observed to be live from the Eocene to Oligocene epoch appearing in tropical sites.
