= Riedelia (fly) =

Scientific classification
- Kingdom: Animalia
- Phylum: Arthropoda
- Class: Insecta
- Order: Diptera
- Family: Tachinidae
- Subfamily: Dexiinae
- Tribe: Imitomyiini
- Genus: Riedelia; Mesnil, 1942

Type species
- Riedelia bicolor Mesnil, 1942

Synonyms
- Riederlia Neave, 1950

Genus of flies

Riedelia is a genus of flies in the family Tachinidae.

== Species ==
- Riedelia bicolor Mesnil, 1942

== Distribution ==
Japan, Russia, China.
