= Miracula =

Scientific classification
- Domain: Eukaryota
- Clade: Sar
- Clade: Stramenopiles
- Phylum: Oomycota
- Class: Peronosporomycetes
- Order: Miraculales
- Family: Miraculaceae; A. Buaya, L. Hanic & Thines, 2017
- Genus: Miracula; A. Buaya, L. Hanic & Thines, 2017

Type species
- Miracula helgolandica A. Buaya, L. Hanic & Thines, 2017

Genus of oomycetes

Miracula is a genus of parasitic protists that parasite diatoms, containing the type species Miracula helgolandica. More recently, the species Miracula moenusica from the river Main in Frankfurt am Main, Miracula islandica from a shore in the north of Iceland, Miracula einbuarlaekurica from a streamlet in the north of Iceland, and Miracula blauvikensis from the shore at the research station Blávík in the east fjords of Iceland were added to the genus. It is the only genus in the family Miraculaceae, of uncertain taxonomic position within the Oomycetes. They are sister to most other lineages in the Oomycetes.

== Species ==
- Miracula blauvikensis A. Buaya & Thines, 2022
- Miracula helgolandica A. Buaya, L. Hanic & Thines, 2017
- Miracula islandica A. Buaya, Scholz & Thines, 2021
- Miracula moenusica A. Buaya & Thines, 2019
- Miracula einbuarlaekurica A. Buaya & Thines, 2021
