= Williamriedelia =

Scientific classification
- Domain: Eukaryota
- Clade: Diaphoretickes
- Clade: SAR
- Clade: Stramenopiles
- Phylum: Gyrista
- Subphylum: Ochrophytina
- Class: Bacillariophyceae
- Order: Hemiaulales
- Family: Hemiaulaceae
- Genus: †Williamriedelia; T.V. Desikachary & P. Prema in Prema & Desikachary, 2012

Synonyms
- Riedelia A.P. Jousé & V.S. Sheshukova-Poretzkaja, 1971; Williamriedelia S.Blanco & C.E.Wetzel, 2016

Genus of single-celled organisms

Williamriedelia (syn. Riedelia) is a genus of diatoms known from the fossil record, comprising approximately three species. Many of the species were originally described under the closely allied genus Hemiaulus. Paleontologists Hans-Joachim Schrader and Juliane Fenner, working with fossil specimens obtained from Leg 38 of the Deep Sea Drilling Program in the Norwegian and Greenland Seas, decided that several previous descriptions of diatoms belonging to Hemiaulus were rightfully placed on Williamriedelia. Schrader and Fenner note that while Hemiaulus diatoms have polygonal areolated valves, Williamriedelia valves are punctate with isolated punctae. Additionally, Williamriedelia typically have two spines, while Hemiaulus have only one. These characteristics were used to justify the placement of these species in Williamriedelia.

Riedelia clavigera is known from fossils dating from the early Eocene to the middle Oligocene.

== Species ==
The valid species currently considered to belong to this genus are:

- Williamriedelia borealis (Sheshuk. in Jousé & Sheshuk) Prema & Desikachary, 2012
- Williamriedelia mirabilis (Jousé in Jousé & Sheshuk) Desik. & Prema
- Williamriedelia pacifica (A.P. Jousé in Jousé & Sheshukova-Poretzkaya) T.V. Desikachary & P. Prema in Prema & Desikachary, 2012
