= Amnesic shellfish poisoning =

Syndrome of shellfish poisoning

Amnesic shellfish poisoning (ASP) is an illness caused by consumption of shellfish that contain the marine biotoxin called domoic acid. In mammals, including humans, domoic acid acts as a neurotoxin, causing permanent short-term memory loss, brain damage, and death in severe cases.

This toxin is produced naturally by marine diatoms belonging to the genus Pseudo-nitzschia and the species Nitzschia navis-varingica. When accumulated in high concentrations by shellfish during filter feeding, domoic acid can then be passed on to birds, marine mammals, and humans by consumption of the contaminated shellfish.

Although human illness due to domoic acid has only been associated with shellfish, the toxin can bioaccumulate in many marine organisms that consume phytoplankton, such as anchovies and sardines. Intoxication by domoic acid in nonhuman organisms is frequently referred to as domoic acid poisoning.

== Symptoms and treatment ==
In the brain, domoic acid especially damages the hippocampus and amygdaloid nucleus. It damages the neurons by activating AMPA and kainate receptors, causing an influx of calcium. Although calcium flowing into cells is a normal event, the uncontrolled increase of calcium causes the cell to degenerate.

== Discovery ==
ASP was first discovered in humans late in 1987, when a serious outbreak of food poisoning occurred in eastern Canada. Three elderly patients died and other victims suffered long-term neurological problems. Because the victims suffered from memory loss, the term "amnesic" shellfish poisoning is used.

Epidemiologists from Health Canada quickly linked the illnesses to restaurant meals of cultured mussels harvested from one area in Prince Edward Island, a place never before affected by toxic algae. Mouse bioassays on aqueous extracts of the suspect mussels caused death with some unusual neurotoxic symptoms very different from those of paralytic shellfish poisoning toxins and other known toxins. On December 12, 1987, a team of scientists was assembled at the National Research Council of Canada laboratory in Halifax, Nova Scotia. Integrating bioassay-directed fractionation with chemical analysis, the team identified the toxin on the afternoon of December 16, only four days after the start of the concerted investigation.

== Possible animal effects ==
On June 22, 2006, a California brown pelican, possibly under the influence of domoic acid, flew through the windshield of a car on the Pacific Coast Highway. The phycotoxin is found in the local coastal waters.

According to the Channel Islands Marine and Wildlife Institute,

It is generally accepted that the incidence of problems associated with toxic algae is increasing. Possible reasons to explain this increase include natural mechanisms of species dispersal (currents and tides) to a host of human-related phenomena such as nutrient enrichment (agricultural run-off), climate shifts, or transport of algae species via ship ballast water.

== In popular culture ==
Domoic acid poisoning may have caused an August 18, 1961, invasion of thousands of frantic seabirds in Capitola and Santa Cruz, California. Director Alfred Hitchcock heard about this invasion while working on his adaptation of the Daphne du Maurier novelette "The Birds" for his feature film The Birds (1963), and asked the Santa Cruz Sentinel for any further news copy as "research for his new thriller."

== See also ==
- Diarrhetic shellfish poisoning (DSP)
- Neurotoxic shellfish poisoning (NSP)
- Paralytic shellfish poisoning (PSP)
- Harmful algal blooms (HABs)
