= Domoic acid =

Names
- Preferred IUPAC name (2S,3S,4S)-4-[(2Z,4E,6R)-6-Carboxyhepta-2,4-dien-2-yl]-3-(carboxymethyl)pyrrolidine-2-carboxylic acid

Identifiers
CAS Number	14277-97-5
3D model (JSmol)	Interactive image
ChEBI	CHEBI:34727
ChEMBL	ChEMBL1232313
ChemSpider	4445428
ECHA InfoCard	100.159.099
EC Number	630-802-1
IUPHAR/BPS	4181
PubChem CID	5282253
UNII	M02525818H
CompTox Dashboard (EPA)	DTXSID20274180
- InChI: InChI=1S/C15H21NO6/c1-8(4-3-5-9(2)14(19)20)11-7-16-13(15(21)22)10(11)6-12(17)18/h3-5,9-11,13,16H,6-7H2,1-2H3,(H,17,18)(H,19,20)(H,21,22)/b5-3+,8-4-/t9-,10+,11-,13+/m1/s1 Key: VZFRNCSOCOPNDB-AOKDLOFSSA-N; InChI=1/C15H21NO6/c1-8(4-3-5-9(2)14(19)20)11-7-16-13(15(21)22)10(11)6-12(17)18/h3-5,9-11,13,16H,6-7H2,1-2H3,(H,17,18)(H,19,20)(H,21,22)/b5-3+,8-4-/t9-,10+,11-,13+/m1/s1 Key: VZFRNCSOCOPNDB-AOKDLOFSBM
- SMILES: O=C(O)[C@H]1NC[C@H](/C(=C\C=C\[C@H](C(=O)O)C)C)[C@@H]1CC(=O)O

Properties
Chemical formula	C_{15}H_{21}NO_{6}
Molar mass	311.334 g·mol^{−1}
Density	1.273 g/cm^{3}
Vapor pressure	2.62×10^{−16} mmHg (34.9 fPa)

Hazards
- GHS labelling
Pictograms	(GHS07: Exclamation mark)
Signal word	Warning
Hazard statements	H302, H312, H332
Precautionary statements	P261, P264, P270, P271, P280, P301+P312, P302+P352, P304+P312, P304+P340, P312, P322, P330, P363, P501
- Except where otherwise noted, data are given for materials in their standard state (at 25 °C [77 °F], 100 kPa). verify (what is ?) Infobox references

Domoic acid (DA) is a kainic acid–type neurotoxin that causes amnesic shellfish poisoning (ASP). It is produced by algae and accumulates in shellfish, sardines, and anchovies. When sea lions, otters, cetaceans, humans, and other predators eat contaminated animals, poisoning may result. Exposure to this compound affects the brain, causing seizures, delirium and possibly death.

== History ==
There has been little use of domoic acid throughout history except for in Japan, where it has been used as an anthelmintic for centuries. Domoic acid was first isolated in 1959 from a species of red algae, Chondria armata, in Japan, which is commonly referred to as dōmoi (ドウモイ) in the Tokunoshima dialect, or hanayanagi. Poisonings in history have been rare, or undocumented; however, it is thought that the increase in human activities is resulting in an increasing frequency of harmful algal blooms along coastlines in recent years. In 2015, the North American Pacific coast was heavily impacted by an algal bloom, consisting predominantly of the domoic acid-producing pennate diatom, Pseudo-nitzschia. Consequently, elevated levels of domoic acid were measured in stranded marine mammals, prompting the closure of beaches and damaging razor clam, rock crab and Dungeness crab fisheries.

In 1961, seabirds attacked the Capitola area in California, and though it was never confirmed, it was later hypothesized that they were under the influence of domoic acid.

In 1987, in Prince Edward Island, Canada, there was a shellfish poisoning resulting in 3 deaths. Blue mussels (Mytilus edulis) contaminated with domoic acid were blamed.

Domoic acid has been suggested to have been involved in an incident which took place on June 22, 2006, when a California brown pelican flew through the windshield of a car on the Pacific Coast Highway.

On Friday, June 14, 2019, a teenager was attacked and injured by a sea lion that was alleged to be under the influence of domoic acid in Pismo Beach on the Central California coast.

== Chemistry ==
=== General ===
Domoic acid is a structural analog of kainic acid, proline, and endogenous excitatory neurotransmitter glutamate. Ohfune and Tomita, who wanted to investigate its absolute stereochemistry, were the first and only to synthesize domoic acid in 1982.

=== Biosynthesis ===
In 1999, using ^{13}C- and ^{14}C-labelled precursors, the biosynthesis of domoic acid in the diatom genus Pseudo-nitzschia was examined. After addition of [1,2-13C2]-acetate, NMR spectroscopy showed enrichment of every carbon in domoic acid, indicating incorporation of the carbon isotopes. This enrichment was consistent with two biosynthetic pathways. The labeling pattern determined that domoic acid can be biosynthesized by an isoprenoid intermediate in combination with a tricarboxylic acid (TCA) cycle intermediate.

In 2018, using growth conditions known to induce domoic acid production in Pseudo-nitzschia multiseries, transcriptome sequencing successfully identified candidate domoic acid biosynthesis genes responsible for the pyrrolidine core. These domoic acid biosynthesis genes, or 'Dab' enzymes were heterologously expressed, characterized, and annotated as dabA (terpene cyclase), dabB (hypothetical protein), dabC (α-ketoglutarate–dependent dioxygenase), and dabD (CYP450).

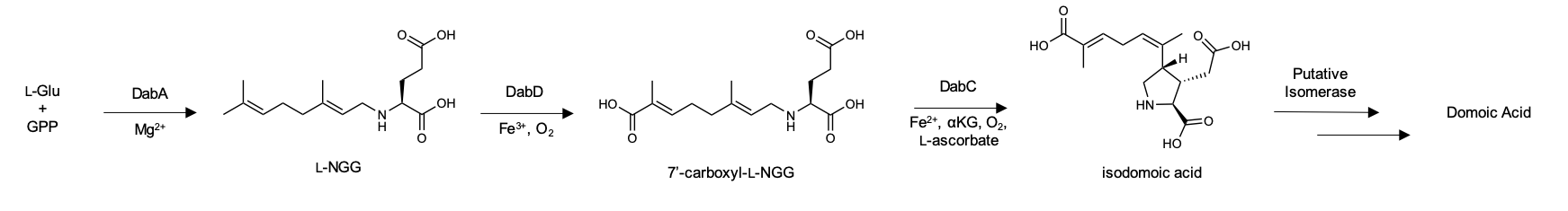
Simplified domoic acid biosynthetic pathway, with all pertinent structures, enzymes, and cofactors listed as described by Brunson et al., in their article "Biosynthesis of the neurotoxin domoic acid in a bloom-forming diatom".

Domoic acid biosynthesis begins with the DabA-catalyzed geranylation of L-glutamic acid (L-Glu) with geranyl pyrophosphate (GPP) to form N-geranyl-L-glutamic acid (L-NGG). DabD then performs three successive oxidation reactions at the 7′-methyl of L-NGG to produce 7′-carboxy-L-NGG, which is then cyclized by DabC to generate the naturally occurring isodomoic acid A. Finally, an uncharacterized isomerase could convert isodomoic acid A to domoic acid. Further investigation is needed to resolve the final isomerization reaction to complete the pathway to Domoic acid.

=== Synthesis ===
Synthesis of Domoic Acid as described by Jonathan Clayden, Benjamin Read and Katherine R. Hebditch, in their article Chemistry of domoic acid, isodomoic acids, and their analogues

Using intermediates 5 and 6, a Diels-Alder reaction produced a bicyclic compound (7). 7 then underwent ozonolysis to open the six-membered ring leading to selenide (8). 8 was then deselenated to form 9 (E-9 and Z-9), lastly leading to the formation of (-) domoic acid.

== Mechanism of action ==
The effects of domoic acid have been attributed to several mechanisms, but the one of concern is through glutamate receptors. Domoic acid is an excitatory amino acid analogue of glutamate, a neurotransmitter in the brain that activates glutamate receptors. Domoic acid has a very strong affinity for these receptors, which results in excitotoxicity initiated by an integrative action on ionotropic glutamate receptors at both sides of the synapse, coupled with the effect of blocking the channel from rapid desensitization. In addition there is a synergistic effect with endogenous glutamate and N-Methyl-D-aspartate receptor agonists that contribute to the excitotoxicity.

In the brain, domoic acid especially damages the hippocampus and amygdaloid nucleus. It damages the neurons by activating AMPA and kainate receptors, causing an influx of calcium. Although calcium flowing into cells is normal, the uncontrolled increase of calcium causes the cells to degenerate. Because the hippocampus may be severely damaged, short-term memory loss occurs. It may also cause kidney damage – even at levels considered safe for human consumption, a new study in mice has revealed. The kidney is affected at a hundred times lower than the concentration allowed under FDA regulations.

Symptoms of domoic acid
Humans	Animals
vomiting	head weaving
nausea	seizures
diarrhea and abdominal cramps within 24 hours of ingestion	bulging eyes
headache	mucus from the mouth
dizziness	disorientation and aggressiveness
confusion, disorientation	death
loss of short-term memory	
motor weakness	
seizures	
profuse respiratory secretions	
cardiac arrhythmias	
coma and possible death	
References for all, unless otherwise noted:

== Toxicology ==
Domoic acid producing algal blooms are associated with the phenomenon of amnesic shellfish poisoning (ASP). Domoic acid can bioaccumulate in marine organisms such as shellfish, anchovies, and sardines that feed on the phytoplankton known to produce this toxin. It can accumulate in high concentrations in the tissues of these plankton feeders when the toxic phytoplankton are high in concentration in the surrounding waters. Domoic acid is a neurotoxin that inhibits neurochemical processes, causing short-term memory loss, brain damage, and, in severe cases, death in humans. In marine mammals, domoic acid typically causes seizures and tremors.

Studies have shown that there are no symptomatic effects in humans at levels of 0.5 mg/kg of body weight. In the 1987 domoic acid poisoning on Prince Edward Island concentrations ranging from 0.31 to 1.28 mg/kg of muscle tissue were noted in people that became ill (three of whom died). Dangerous levels of domoic acid have been calculated based on cases such as the one on Prince Edward island. The exact LD_{50} for humans is unknown; for mice the LD_{50} is 3.6 mg/kg.

New research has found that domoic acid is a heat-resistant and very stable toxin, which can damage kidneys at concentrations that are 100 times lower than what causes neurological effects.

== Diagnosis and prevention ==
In order to be diagnosed and treated if poisoned, domoic acid must first be detected. Methods such as ELISA or probe development with polymerase chain reaction (PCR) may be used to detect the toxin or the organism producing this toxin, respectively.

There is no known antidote available for domoic acid. Therefore, if poisoning occurs, it is advised to go quickly to a hospital. Cooking or freezing affected fish or shellfish tissue that are contaminated with domoic acid does not lessen the toxicity.

As a public health concern, the concentration of domoic acid in shellfish and shellfish parts at point of sale should not exceed the current permissible limit of 20 mg/kg tissue. In addition, during processing shellfish, it is important to pay attention to environmental condition factors.

== In popular culture ==
On August 18, 1961, in Capitola and Santa Cruz, California, there was an invasion of what people described as chaotic seabirds. These birds were believed to be under the influence of domoic acid, and it inspired a scene in Alfred Hitchcock's feature film The Birds.

In the Elementary Season 1 Episode 13 "The Red Team", domoic acid was used as a poison to mimic Alzheimer's.

In the TV show Bunk'd, domoic acid somehow combines with fog to create a chemical that causes people to lose memory or gain alter-egos when inhaled.

== See also ==
- Canadian Reference Materials
- Pseudo-nitzschia
- Quisqualic acid
- Brevetoxin
- Ciguatoxin
- Okadaic acid
- Saxitoxin
- Maitotoxin
