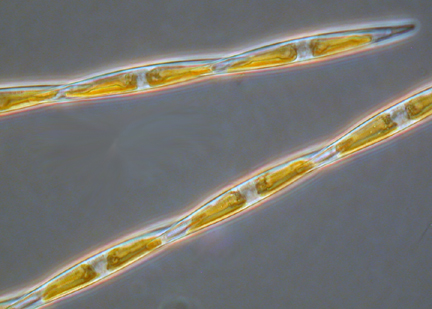

Scientific classification
- Domain: Eukaryota
- Supergroup: Stramenopiles
- Division: Ochrophyta
- Clade: Bacillariophyta
- Class: Bacillariophyceae
- Order: Bacillariales
- Family: Bacillariaceae
- Genus: Pseudo-nitzschia; H. Perag. in H. Perag. and Perag.

= Pseudo-nitzschia =

Genus of marine planktonic diatoms

Pseudo-nitzschia is a marine planktonic diatom genus that accounts for 4.4% of pennate diatoms found worldwide. Some species are capable of producing the neurotoxin domoic acid (DA), which is responsible for the neurological disorder in humans known as amnesic shellfish poisoning (ASP). Currently, 58 species are known, 28 of which have been shown to produce DA. It was originally hypothesized that only dinoflagellates could produce harmful algal toxins, but a deadly bloom of Pseudo-nitzschia occurred in 1987 in the bays of Prince Edward Island, Canada, and led to an outbreak of ASP. Over 100 people were affected by this outbreak after consuming contaminated mussels; three people died. Since this event, no additional deaths have been attributed to ASP, though the prevalence of toxic diatoms and DA has increased worldwide. This anomaly is likely due to increased awareness of harmful algal blooms (HABs) and their implications for human and ecosystem health.

Blooms have since been characterized in coastal waters and the open-ocean worldwide and have been linked to increasing marine nutrient concentrations, warming ocean temperatures, and bacterial interactions.

== Morphology and physiology ==
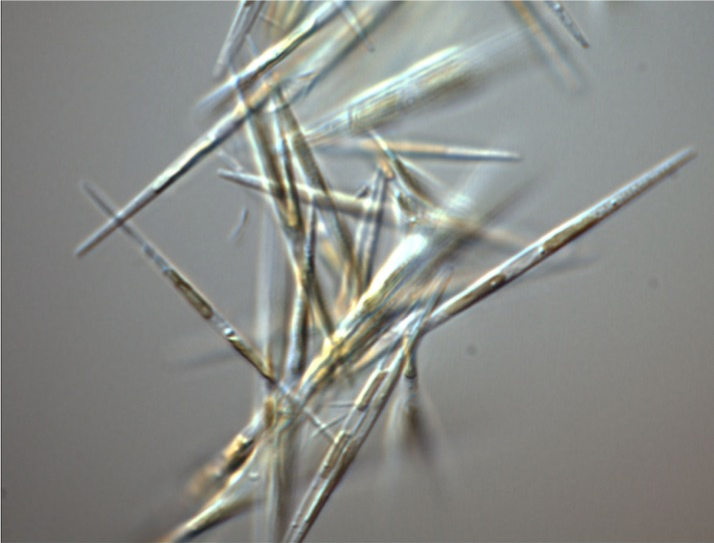
The diatom Pseudo-nitzschia granii is a common responder to iron enrichment in iron-limited regions of the ocean

Pseudo-nitzschia species are bilaterally symmetrical pennate diatoms. Cell walls are made up of elongated silica frustules. The silica wall is fairly dense which leads to negative buoyancy, providing a number of advantages. The wall allows the diatoms to sink to avoid light inhibition or nutrient limitations, as well as to protect against grazing zooplankton. The silica frustules also contribute vastly to the sediment layers of the earth and to the fossil record, which makes them exceptionally useful in increasing understanding of numerous processes such as gauging the degree of climate change. Before sinking to the ocean floor, every atom of silicon that enters the ocean is integrated into the cell wall of a diatom about 40 times.

Silica frustules contain a central raphe, which secretes mucilage that allows the cells to move by gliding. Cells are often found in overlapped, stepped colonies, and exhibit collective motility. Pseudo-nitzschia species synthesize their own food through the use of light and nutrients in photosynthesis. The diatoms have a central vacuole to store nutrients for later use and a light-harvesting system to protect themselves against high-intensity light.

== Taxonomy ==
The diatom lineage may go back 180 to 250 million years ago (Mya). About 65 Mya, diatoms survived a mass extinction in which roughly 85% of all species perished. Until 1994, the genus was known as Nitzschia, but was changed to Pseudo-nitzschia because of the ability to form chains of overlapping cells, as well as other minor morphological differences. While the genus can be readily recognized using light microscopy, identification of distinct species can require taxonomic expertise and be extremely time-consuming. Species identification in this genus is notoriously difficult due to the presence of cryptic species. Similar species are often differentiated by very small differences in the frustule, such as shape, period, and band stria.

The direct impacts of species identification on public health make this a serious concern. Toxogenic and nontoxogenic species commonly co-occur; therefore, discrimination between various Pseudo-nitzschia species is imperative to determine the potential toxicity of an algal bloom. Optical microscopy identification techniques are inadequate when a large number of samples must be routinely examined, such as is required for a monitoring program for public health. Recently, a DNA-microarray was developed for simultaneous detection of multiple harmful algal bloom species with an emphasis on Pseudo-nitzschia. The total assay is believed to have the potential to identify hundreds of species and accurately differentiate between large quantities of related species. Additionally, this technology has been shown to accurately identify toxic phytoplankton even at extremely low concentrations. The lower limit for detection of Pseudo-nitzschia is as low as 500 cells.

The nomenclatural history is given in Hasle (1995) and Bates (2000).

== Lifecycle ==
=== Ornithine-urea cycle ===
The physiological distribution, fixation, and recycling center for inorganic carbon and nitrogen plays a key role in the metabolic response of diatoms to prolonged nutrient deprivation. The cycle enables diatoms to respond immediately to the availability of nutrients and recover by increasing their metabolic and growth rates.

=== Resting stages ===
Diatoms have the ability to enter two distinct resting stages to overcome periods of stress. A resting spore has a great capacity to survive over extended periods of nutrient deprivation. To avoid low nutrient concentrations during stratification, the resting spores can settle to the bottom where the nutrient concentration is higher. A resting cell is better able to rapidly respond when nutrients become available again. This is more often observed in freshwater and pennate diatoms like Pseudo-nitzschia. There is contradictory evidence regarding the presence or absence of a resting stage in Pseudo-nitzschia.

=== Reproduction ===
Among diatoms, reproduction is primarily asexual by binary fission, with each daughter cell receiving one of the parent's cell's two frustules. However, this asexual division results in a size reduction. To restore the cell size of a diatom population, sexual reproduction must occur. Vegetative diploid cells undergo meiosis to produce active and passive gametes. These gametes then fuse to form a zygote, which then develops into an auxospore. Sexual reproduction leads to both an increase in genotypic diversity and the formation of large initial cells through formation of the auxospore. Cells need to be below a species-specific size threshold for the sexual phase to be induced. Many external cues also regulate the initiation, such as day length, irradiance, and temperature.

The basic mode of the sexual phase of reproduction appears to be conserved among Pseudo-nitzschia species. Upon mixing two strains of compatible mating type and of appropriate cell size for sexualization, cells align side by side and differentiate into gametangia. One active (+) and one passive (-) gamete are then produced within each gametangium. The active gamete migrates toward the passive partner and conjugates. The zygote is then becomes an auxospore, which has no rigid frustule. Inside the auxospore, a large initial cell is produced.

Sexual reproduction appears to occur exclusively in the exponential growth phase and be linked to cell density. Sexualization can only be initiated when a species-specific threshold cell concentration is met. Decreasing the distance to facilitate contact and/or perception of chemical cues between cells triggers the sexual phase, indicating that high cell density is favorable for sexual reproduction. Additionally, the onset of sexualization is linked to a significant reduction in growth of the vegetative and parental cells, suggesting that vegetative division is inhibited when the two strains of opposite mating type come in contact.

== Genome and transcriptome ==
Pseudo-nitzschia multiseries has a genome consisting of 219 megabases (Mb) and a full genome project is underway.

Transcriptomes of three species, P. arenysensis, P. delicatissima, and P. multistriata, have been sequenced. The transcriptomes encode between 17,500 and 20,200 proteins. P. multistriata was found to uniquely encode nitric oxide synthase.

Recently, transcriptome analysis of P. multiseries was used to identify a four-gene cluster linked to DA biosynthesis. The identification of these genes presents an opportunity to monitor toxic blooms of Pseudo-nitzschia genetically in order to better understand the toxicity and environmental conditions that cause them.

== Habitat ==
In general, diatoms flourish in nutrient-rich waters with high light penetration. Some species of Pseudo-nitzschia can grow in a broad temperature range (4–20 °C or 39–68 °F), making it possible for them to inhabit a diverse range of habitats.

Pseudo-nitzschia species have been observed in all oceans of the world, including the Arctic and Antarctic. In North America, they have been documented along the Pacific coast from Canada to California, along the Atlantic Northeast coast of Canada, North Carolina, and the Gulf of Mexico. Various species have been detected in the open ocean as well as gulfs and bays, showing a presence in many diverse environments, including off the coasts of Canada, Portugal, France, Italy, Croatia, Greece, Ireland, Australia, Morocco, Japan, Spain, Tunisia, Namibia, Singapore, Angola, Philippines, Turkey, Ukraine, Argentina, and Uruguay.

Given the warming temperatures of ocean water, decreasing sea ice, and increasing light penetration brought on by climate change, it is likely that the season for favorable growth of toxigenic Pseudo-nitzschia species will expand. It is important to continue monitoring Pseudo-nitzschia blooms and their toxicity, particularly in Arctic and Antarctic habitats that may begin to see higher prevalence of these species.

== Harmful bloom dynamics ==
Harmful algal blooms (HABs) of Pseudo-nitzschia and the like can cause diseases and death in many marine organisms, as well as the humans who consume them. HABs can result in oxygen depletion caused by increased biomass production. However, blooms of Pseudo-nitzschia more commonly cause harm through the production of the toxin DA, which can be transferred to other trophic levels through bioaccumulation.

DA can often be detected in shellfish flesh during and immediately following a toxic bloom. Though shellfish harvest closures are typically based on cells counts of Pseudo-nitzschia present, these cell counts do not always correlate with DA levels. Thus, it is important to understand the other environmental drivers that may lead to higher production of DA.

The largest recorded DA event caused by Pseudo-nitzschia took place along the North American west coast in 2015, causing prolonged closures of razor clam, rock crab, and Dungeness crab fisheries. Later in 2015, DA was detected in whales, dolphins, porpoises, seals, and sea lions. This bloom was dominated by P. australis and likely caused by anomalous warm water and nutrients brought to the surface by upwelling conditions.

Prior to this 2015 bloom, the largest Pseudo-nitzschia bloom recorded occurred in September 2004 off the northwest coast of the United States. The maximum cell densities during this bloom reached 13 × 10^{6} cells per liter, with domoic acid levels of 1.3 pg DA/cell.

Sediment cores indicate a link between increasing coastal nutrient levels (eutrophication) and an increase in Pseudo-nitzschia blooms.

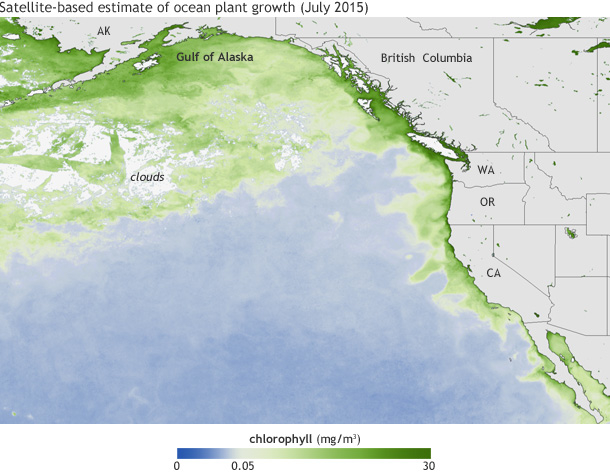
The largest toxic Pseudo-nitzschia bloom was recorded in 2015 along the west coast of North America.

== Domoic acid ==
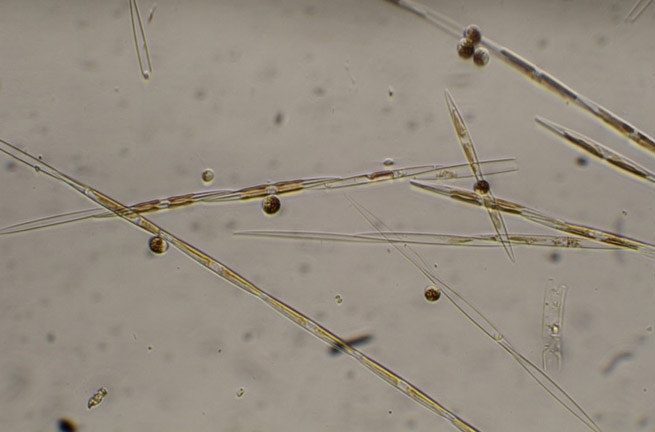
Pseudo-nitzchia

Shellfish become contaminated after feeding on toxic Pseudo-nitzschia blooms and can act as a vector to transfer domoic acid to humans upon ingestion. DA acts as a potent glutamate agonist and is responsible for amnesic shellfish poisoning in humans. Effects can be as minor as vomiting, cramps, and a headache, or as severe as permanent anterograde memory loss, coma, and death. So, monitoring systems and management practices for recreational and commercial fishing are important to ensure the health of marine animals and their predators.

Photosynthesis is essential for the production of domoic acid. Periods of darkness or chemical inhibition of photosynthesis has been shown to inhibit toxin production. Additionally, DA production peaks in the stationary phase of the growth cycle when cell division is slowed or absent. Production is minimal or nonexistent during the exponential phase, and ceases completely during the death phase of the growth cycle.

=== Factors affecting production ===
Many factors have been linked to promotion of DA production, including sufficient light, elevated or decreased pH, and nutrition limitations. In one species, P. cuspidata, a link has been indicated between toxicity and photosynthesis photon flux density (PPFD). At a low PPFD, the exponential growth rate approximately halved and the cells were significantly more toxic.

While the effect of availability of different nitrogen sources on toxicity has been studied many times, no general rule could be demonstrated for differences in growth and DA production, with the results varying greatly by species. However, toxin production increases when the nitrogen source could not sustain a high biomass, suggesting growth limitation seems to induce toxicity.

The presence of zooplankton has also been shown to affect the toxicity of Pseudo-nitzschia. The presence of copepods was shown to enhance toxin production of P. seriata. This effect appears to be chemically mediated, as it could be induced without physical contact.

Pseudo-nitzschia species also appear to respond dramatically to differences in trace metal concentrations, such as iron (Fe) and copper (Cu). In Fe-limited conditions, Pseudo-nitzschia increases DA production by six to 25 times as a result of stress. This increase allows them to enhance Fe acquisition needed for metabolic activities, and can have devastating effects.

== Known species ==
Over fifty species of Pseudo-nitzschia have been described (following WoRMS unless specified):

- Pseudo-nitzschia abrensis Pérez-Aicua & Orive, 2013
- Pseudo-nitzschia allochrona Zingone, Percopo et Sarno, 2022
- Pseudo-nitzschia americana (Hasle) Fryxell, 1993
- Pseudo-nitzschia antarctica (uncertain, unassessed)
- Pseudo-nitzschia arctica Percopo & Sarno, 2016
- Pseudo-nitzschia arenysensis Quijano-Scheggia, Garcés & Lundholm, 2009
- Pseudo-nitzschia australis Frenguelli, 1939
- Pseudo-nitzschia batesiana H.C.Lim, S.T.Teng, C.P.Leaw & P.T.Lim, 2013
- Pseudo-nitzschia bipertita S.T.Teng, H.C.Lim & C.P.Leaw, 2016
- Pseudo-nitzschia brasiliana N.Lundholm, G.R.Hasle & G.A.Fryxell, 2002
- Pseudo-nitzschia bucculenta F. Gai, C. K. Hedemand, N. Lundholm & Ø. Moestrup, 2018
- Pseudo-nitzschia caciantha Lundholm, Moestrup & Hasle, 2003
- Pseudo-nitzschia calliantha Lundholm, Moestrup & Hasle, 2003
- Pseudo-nitzschia chiniana C.X. Huang & Yang Li, 2019
- Pseudo-nitzschia circumpora H.C.Lim, C.P.Leaw & P.T.Lim, 2012
- Pseudo-nitzschia cuspidata (Hasle) Hasle, 1993
- Pseudo-nitzschia decipiens Lundholm & Moestrup, 2006 (uncertain, unassessed)
- Pseudo-nitzschia delicatissima (Cleve) Heiden, 1928
- Pseudo-nitzschia dolorosa Lundholm & Moestrup, 2006 (uncertain, unassessed)
- Pseudo-nitzschia fraudulenta (Cleve) Hasle, 1993
- Pseudo-nitzschia fryxelliana Lundholm, 2012
- Pseudo-nitzschia fukuyoi H.Ch.Lim, S.T.Teng, Ch.P.Leaw & P.T.Lim, 2013
- Pseudo-nitzschia galaxiae N.Lundholm & Ø.Moestrup, 2002
- Pseudo-nitzschia granii (G.R.Hasle) G.R.Hasle, 1974
- Pseudo-nitzschia hainanensis X.M. Chen & Y. Li, 2020
- Pseudo-nitzschia hallegraeffii P.A. Ajani, A. Verma et S.A. Murray, 2018
- Pseudo-nitzschia hasleana Lundholm, 2012
- Pseudo-nitzschia heimii Manguin, 1957
- Pseudo-nitzschia inflatula (G.R.Hasle) G.R.Hasle, 1993
- Pseudo-nitzschia kodamae S.T. Teng, H.C. Lim, C.P. Leaw & P.T. Lim, 2015
- Pseudo-nitzschia limii S.T.Teng, H.C.Lim & C.P.Leaw, 2016
- Pseudo-nitzschia linea Lundholm, Hasle & G.A.Fryxell, 2002
- Pseudo-nitzschia lineola (Cleve) Hasle, 1965
- Pseudo-nitzschia lundholmiae H.C.Lim, S.T.Teng, C.P.Leaw & P.T.Lim, 2013
- Pseudo-nitzschia mannii Amato & Montresor, 2008 (uncertain, unassessed)
- Pseudo-nitzschia micropora K.Priisholm, Ø.Moestrup & N.Lundholm, 2002 (uncertain, unassessed)
- Pseudo-nitzschia multiseries (Hasle) Hasle, 1995
- Pseudo-nitzschia multistriata (Takano) Takano, 1995
- Pseudo-nitzschia nanaoensis Yang Li & H.C. Dong, 2018
- Pseudo-nitzschia obtusa (Hasle) Hasle & Lundholm, 2005
- Pseudo-nitzschia plurisecta Orive & Pérez-Aicua, 2013
- Pseudo-nitzschia prolongatoides (G.R.Hasle) G.R.Hasle, 1993
- Pseudo-nitzschia pseudodelicatissima (Hasle) Hasle, 1993
- Pseudo-nitzschia pungens (Grunow ex Cleve) G.R.Hasle, 1993
- Pseudo-nitzschia pungiformis (G.R.Hasle) G.R.Hasle, 1993
- Pseudo-nitzschia qiana C.X. Huang & Yang Li, 2019
- Pseudo-nitzschia roundii D.U.Hernández-Becerril, 2006
- Pseudo-nitzschia sabit S.T. Teng, H.C. Lim, P.T. Lim & C.P. Leaw, 2015
- Pseudo-nitzschia seriata (Cleve) H.Peragallo, 1899
- Pseudo-nitzschia simulans Li, Huang & Xu, 2017
- Pseudo-nitzschia sinica Y.Z.Qi & J.Wang, nom. inval.
- Pseudo-nitzschia subcurvata (G.R.Hasle) G.A.Fryxell, 1993
- Pseudo-nitzschia subfraudulenta (G.R.Hasle) G.R.Hasle, 1993
- Pseudo-nitzschia subpacifica (Hasle) Hasle, 1993
- Pseudo-nitzschia taiwanensis X.M. Chen & Y. Li, 2020
- Pseudo-nitzschia turgidula (Hustedt) G.R.Hasle, 1993
- Pseudo-nitzschia turgiduloides (G.R.Hasle) G.R.Hasle, 1996 (uncertain, unassessed)
- Pseudo-nitzschia uniseriata H.C. Dong & Y. Li, 2020
- Pseudo-nitzschia yuensis H.C. Dong & Y. Li, 2020

Many species of Pseudo-nitzschia have been shown to produce domoic acid, although not all strains are toxigenic.

- Pseudo-nitzschia abrensis
- Pseudo-nitzschia australis
- Pseudo-nitzschia batesiana
- Pseudo-nitzschia bipertita
- Pseudo-nitzschia brasiliana
- Pseudo-nitzschia caciantha
- Pseudo-nitzschia calliantha
- Pseudo-nitzschia cuspidata
- Pseudo-nitzschia delicatissima
- Pseudo-nitzschia fraudulenta
- Pseudo-nitzschia fukuyoi
- Pseudo-nitzschia galaxiae
- Pseudo-nitzschia granii
- Pseudo-nitzschia hasleana
- Pseudo-nitzschia kodamae
- Pseudo-nitzschia lundholmiae
- Pseudo-nitzschia multiseries
- Pseudo-nitzschia multistriata
- Pseudo-nitzschia obtusa
- Pseudo-nitzschia plurisecta
- Pseudo-nitzschia pseudodelicatissima
- Pseudo-nitzschia pungens
- Pseudo-nitzschia seriata
- Pseudo-nitzschia simulans
- Pseudo-nitzschia subcurvata
- Pseudo-nitzschia subfraudulenta
- Pseudo-nitzschia subpacifica
- Pseudo-nitzschia turgidula
