= Imitomyiini =

Scientific classification
- Kingdom: Animalia
- Phylum: Arthropoda
- Clade: Pancrustacea
- Class: Insecta
- Order: Diptera
- Family: Tachinidae
- Subfamily: Dexiinae
- Tribe: Imitomyiini; Townsend, 1936

Tribe of flies

Imitomyiini is a tribe of flies in the family Tachinidae.

== Genera ==
- Imitomyia Townsend, 1912
- Proriedelia Mesnil, 1953
- Riedelia Mesnil, 1942
