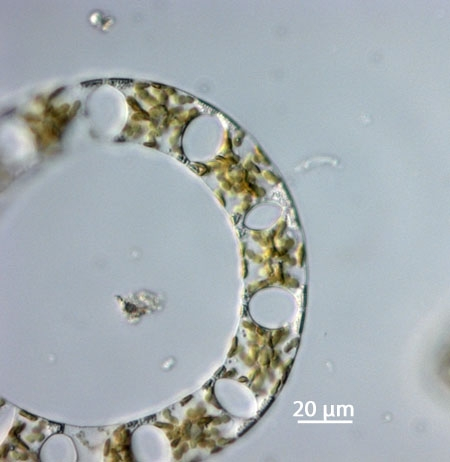
- Eucampia zodiacus

Scientific classification
- Domain: Eukaryota
- Clade: Sar
- Clade: Stramenopiles
- Division: Ochrophyta
- Clade: Bacillariophyta
- Class: Thalassiosirophyceae
- Order: Eucampiales
- Genus: Eucampia; Ehrenberg, 1839

= Eucampia =

Genus of single-celled organisms

Eucampia is a genus of marine centric diatoms. It was first described by Ehrenberg in 1839.

== Species ==
- Eucampia groenlandica
- Eucampia zodiacus
- Eucampia cornuta
