= Zetekitoxin AB =

Names
- IUPAC name [(3R,5S,6S,11R,12S,14Z,16S,17Z)-14,17-Diamino-19,19-dihydroxy-6-(hydroxymethyl)-10-oxo-3-(sulfooxy)-8-oxa-1,9,13,15,18-pentaazapentacyclo[9.5.2.1~3,16~.0~5,9~.0~12,16~]nonadeca-14,17-dien-13-yl]methyl hydroxycarbamate
- Other names ZTX AB

Identifiers
| CAS Number | 62996-38-7 |
| 3D model (JSmol) | Interactive image |
| ChEMBL | ChEMBL3617050 |
| ChemSpider | 10207686 |
| PubChem CID | 21589240 |
| UNII | C7A2UZ79FJ |
- InChI: InChI=1S/C16H24N8O12S/c17-11-19-8-9-15(20-12(18)22(9)5-34-13(27)21-30)16(28,29)14(4-23(11)15,36-37(31,32)33)1-7-6(2-25)3-35-24(7)10(8)26/h6-9,25,28-30H,1-5H2,(H2,17,19)(H2,18,20)(H,21,27)(H,31,32,33)/t6-,7-,8+,9-,14+,15-/m0/s1 Key: BJJIKPMJNDTIHW-FGWFJEOOSA-N
- SMILES: [H]/N=C/1\N2[C@@]34N/C(=N/[H])/N([C@H]3[C@@H](N1)C(=O)N5OC[C@@H]([C@@H]5C[C@@](C2)([C@]4(O)O)OS(=O)(=O)O)CO)COC(=O)NO

Properties
| Chemical formula | C_{16}H_{24}N_{8}O_{12}S |
| Molar mass | 552.47 g·mol^{−1} |

Hazards
- Occupational safety and health (OHS/OSH)
| Main hazards | Extremely toxic |
- Lethal dose or concentration (LD, LC)
| LD_{50} (median dose) | 11 μg/kg (mice) |

Related compounds
| Related compounds | Saxitoxin; Gonyautoxin; Neosaxitoxin; Tetrodotoxin |
- Except where otherwise noted, data are given for materials in their standard state (at 25 °C [77 °F], 100 kPa). Infobox references

Zetekitoxin AB (ZTX AB) is a guanidine alkaloid neurotoxin found in the skin of Panamanian golden frog Atelopus zeteki. It was firstly reported in 1969 by Mosher and colleagues who originally designated it as atelopidtoxin and renamed zetekitoxin to indicate a unique occurrence in Atelopus zeteki

Subsequent studies failed to reveal the structure of the major toxic component zetekitoxin AB (LD_{50} i.p. mouse, 11 μg/kg) or the minor component zetekitoxin C (LD_{50} i.p. mouse, 80 μg/kg). For decades it was regarded as one of the most potent neurotoxins known.

Early research indicated that zetekitoxin AB might consist of two closely related compounds, hence the "AB" designation. In 2004, Yotsu-Yamashita and coworkers determined its chemical structure, revealing it to be a saxitoxin analog, and confirmed that it exists as a single compound.

== Natural source ==
Zetekitoxin AB was first extracted in 1969 from the skin of the Panamanian golden frog (Atelopus zeteki), together with the minor congener zetekitoxin C. The species remains the only known natural source of zetekitoxin AB. Like saxitoxin, zetekitoxin AB is not produced by Atelopus zeteki itself, but is instead acquired from exogenous bacteria associated with the frog's diet. However, Atelopus zeteki is classified as Critically Endangered, and individuals raised in captivity do not produce the toxin. To date, no method has been developed for the synthetic or alternative production of zetekitoxin AB. Only approximately 0.3 mg of the rare sample remained in the world, and this material was used for the structural determination of zetekitoxin AB in 2004.

== Toxity and mechanism of action ==
Zetekitoxin AB is a highly potent voltage-dependent sodium channel blocker and neurotoxin whose LD_{50} in mice is 11 μg/kg. Its main biological activity is the high-affinity blocking of NaV channels, leading to inhibition of neuromuscular conduction and cardiac function.

As lack of samples available for testing, detailed mechanism of zetekitoxin AB is still noy clear so far. It is assumed that zetekitoxin AB has similar biochemical mechanism with other saxitoxin analogues: The positively charged guanidinium groups (1,2,3- and 7,8,9-guanidinium) of saxitoxin analogues serve as the primary anchors by inserting into the outer vestibule of the voltage-gated sodium channel (Na_{V}) and forming extensive electrostatic interactions with the conserved acidic residues on the P2 helices, while the gem-diol moiety at C12 provides critical additional hydrogen bonds that further stabilize the toxin in the selectivity filter vestibule, together enabling the picomolar-affinity pore blockade of Na⁺ conductance. But Zetekitoxin AB represents significantly more potent, making it one of the most potent sodium channel blockers reported to date from natural products.

In electrophysiological assays using Xenopus oocytes expressing mammalian NaV channels, zetekitoxin AB exhibited IC_{50} values of 280 ± 3 pM for the human heart channel (hH1A), 6.1 ± 0.4 pM for the rat brain IIa channel (rBr2A), and 65 ± 10 pM for the rat skeletal muscle channel (μ). Compared with saxitoxin under identical conditions, ZTX AB is ~580-fold more potent on the heart channel, ~160-fold on the brain channel, and ~63-fold on the skeletal muscle channel, confirming its profile as one of the most potent natural sodium-channel blockers known.

== Structure assignment and suspicion ==
Zetekitoxin AB was characterized by Yotsu-Yamashita and colleagues in 2004 as a unique guanidine alkaloid structurally related to saxitoxin. Its proposed structure features an unprecedented, highly strained 9-membered N-acylisoxazolidine-bridged macrocycle, a sulfonate group, and an N-hydroxycarbamate moiety.

Comparison of carbonyl ^{13}C NMR chemical shifts between synthetic models and zetekitoxin AB.

The elucidation of its unique structure immediately captured the attention of the synthetic community, stimulating intense pursuit of its total synthesis. Beginning in 2009, Toshio Nishikawa, Kazuo Nagasawa, and Ryan E. Looper independently investigated the synthesis of N-acylisoxazolidine models. However, they found that the ^{13}C NMR chemical shifts of the carbonyl carbons in these synthetic models appearing approximately 170 ppm (similar to those of typical amides) were significantly higher than that observed in Zetekitoxin AB (156.5 ppm), which has raised significant questions to the initial structural assignment, but can still be rationalized by significant decoupling of the isoxazolidine nitrogen non-bonding electrons from the carbonyl due to the strained 9-membered bridged ring system or complex shielding phenomenon imposed by the rigid three dimensional structure of ZTX which significantly effects this carbonyl.

=== Direct structural challenging ===
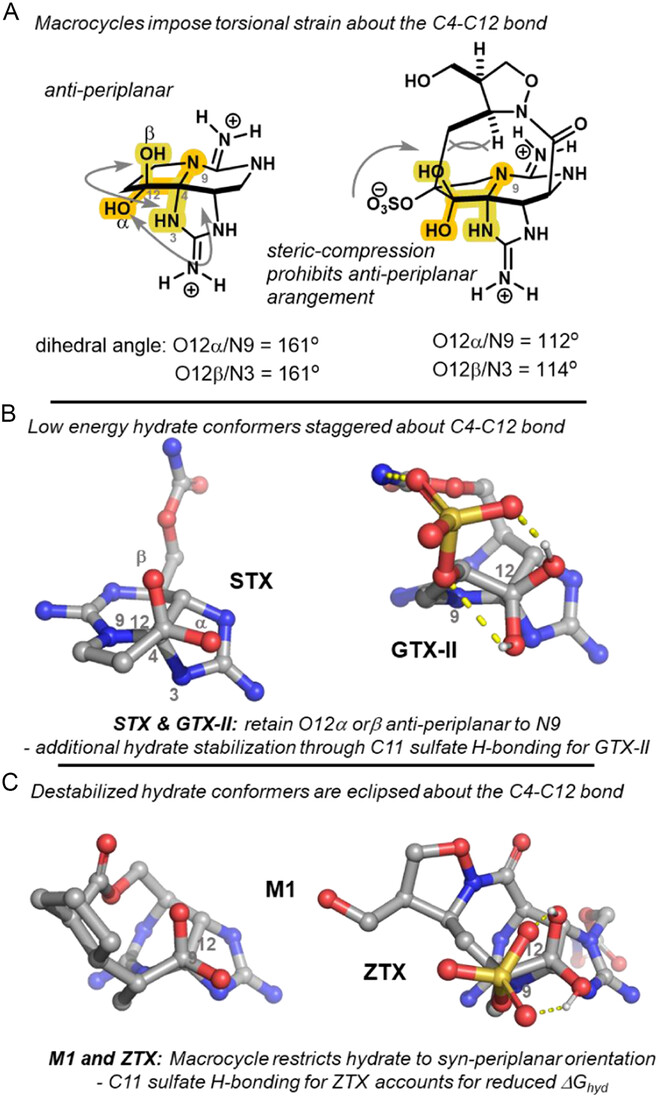
Dihedral angle restrictions in the bridged macrocyclic system of zetekitoxin AB destabilize the formation of the gem-diol (DFT calculations).

In 2019, Looper and coworkers first synthesized a unique 9-membered bridged macrocyclic lactone analogue of saxitoxin via transannular functionalization. This result supported the feasibility of synthesizing Zetekitoxin AB through direct bridged-ring closure. However, in 2025, they were unable to apply this strategy successfully to the synthesis of zetekitoxin AB itself. Subsequently, they utilized an intramolecular Michael addition to construct a 10-membered bridged macrocyclic lactone analogue containing a cyclopentane substructure that mimics the N-acylisoxazolidine moiety in zetekitoxin AB. To their surprise, this synthetic model exhibited a strong tendency for dehydration of the gem-diol. In contrast, the gem-diol form is stable in saxitoxin analogues and plays a critical role in their bioactivity. This unusual observation prompted further examination of the dehydration tendency in bridged macrocyclic saxitoxin analogues. None of the synthetic bridged macrocyclic models stabilized in the gem-diol form; instead, they existed in the ketone form. Further DFT calculations indicated that the eclipsed conformation resulting from dihedral restrictions imposed by the bridged macrocyclic system significantly destabilized the formation of gem-diol. This destabilization could not be offset by electrostatic interactions between the gem-diol and the guanidinium cation moiety, even in the case of zetekitoxin AB itself, whereas the gem-diol prefers a staggered conformation in natural bioactive Saxitoxin analogues. Given that Zetekitoxin AB is a more potent Na_{V} inhibitor than Saxitoxin, its existence as the ketone rather than the gem-diol form would seriously violate the established structure–activity relationship. This work provides the first direct computational evidence that calls the structure of zetekitoxin AB into question.

== Total synthetic studies ==
So far the total synthesis of zetekitoxin AB has not been accomplished yet. Most of effort still concentrate on the synthesis of N-acylisoxazolidine substructure.

In 2019, Looper and coworkers reported the synthesis of a unique nine-membered bridged macrocyclic lactone analogue of saxitoxin through a transannular functionalization strategy. This model study offered intriguing hints regarding the possibility of constructing zetekitoxin AB via direct bridged-ring closure. In 2023, Nagasawa and coworkers described their efforts toward constructing the medium-sized ring structure of Zetekitoxin AB via ring-closing metathesis (RCM). They devised a strategy to access a 12-membered bridged macrocyclic system through olefin metathesis, followed by intramolecular ring closure to assemble the N-acylisoxazolidine moiety. Unfortunately, the RCM reaction failed to deliver the desired 12-membered ring-closure product, and instead afforded an 18-membered macrocyclic product in 9% yield when they increase the length of chain. This outcome highlights the significant ring strain inherent in the proposed Zetekitoxin AB skeleton.

== See also ==
- Saxitoxin
- Gonyautoxin
- Tetrodotoxin
