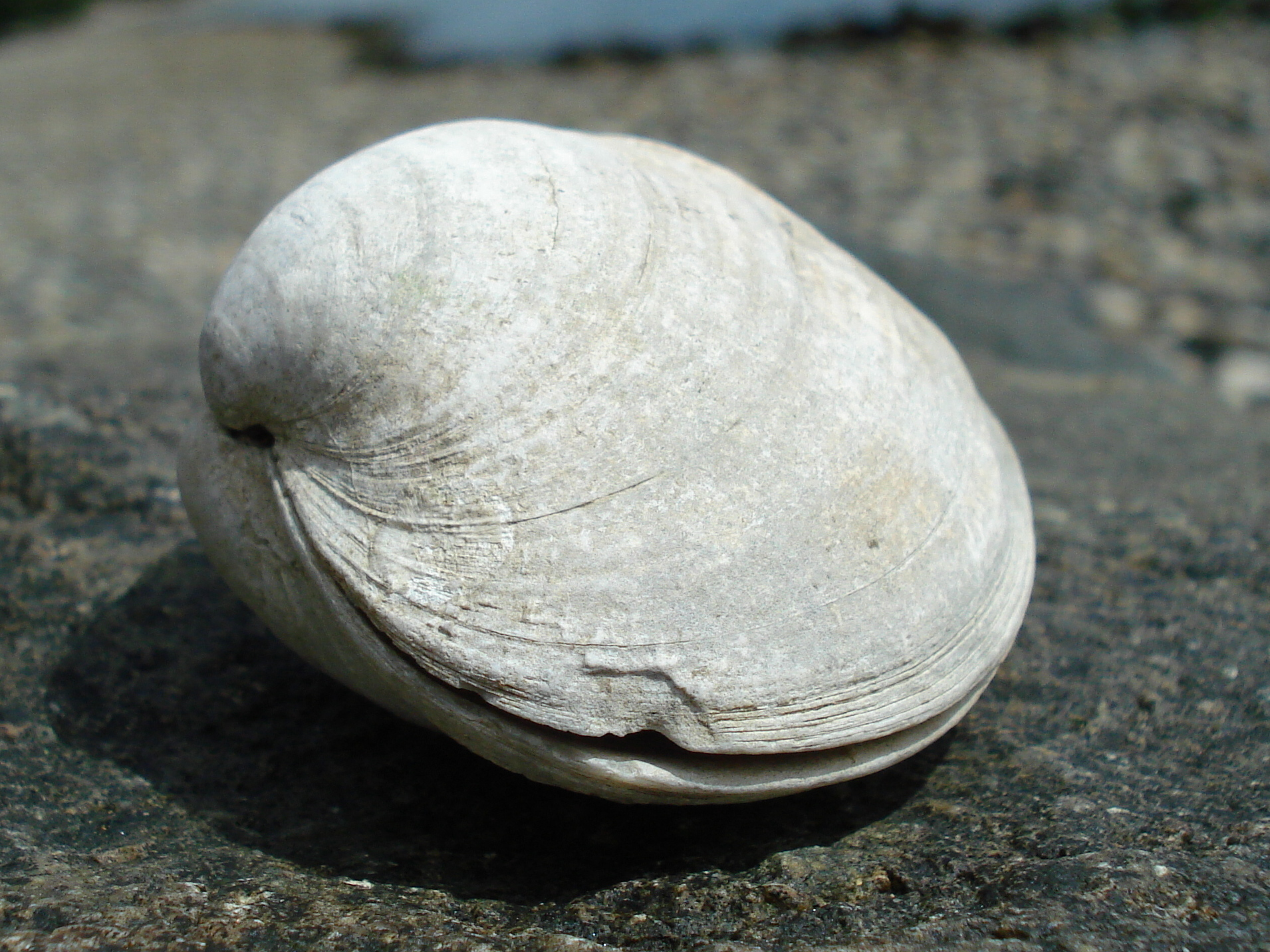

Conservation status
- Secure (NatureServe)

Scientific classification
- Kingdom: Animalia
- Phylum: Mollusca
- Class: Bivalvia
- Order: Venerida
- Family: Veneridae
- Genus: Saxidomus
- Species: S. gigantea

Binomial name
- Saxidomus gigantea (Deshayes, 1839)

Synonyms
- Saxidomus gigantea brevis Dall, 1916; Saxidomus giganteus Deshayes, 1839; Venerupis gigantea Deshayes, 1839; Venus maxima Philippi, 1846

= Saxidomus gigantea =

Species of bivalve

Saxidomus gigantea is a large, edible saltwater clam, a marine bivalve mollusk in the family Veneridae, the venus clams. It can be found along the western coast of North America, ranging from the Aleutian Islands to San Francisco Bay. Common names for this clam include butter clam, Washington clam, smooth Washington clam and money shell.

Numerous valves of this species have been found in the shell middens on Sidney Island in British Columbia, Canada.

== Description ==
This large clam can live for more than twenty years and grow to a length of 15 cm (6 in), with smaller individuals being nearly as high as they are long. The umbones are set at an angle of more than 110° and the ligament joining the valves is black and external. There are no radial ridges but the oval valves are sculpted by well-defined concentric rings. Each valve has three cardinal teeth. The general color of the exterior of the shell is white, but this may be stained reddish-brown by iron sulfide from the sediment. The interior of the shell is smooth and white, but not glossy, with a pallial line, a pallial sinus and two adductor muscle scars of equal size. The siphons are united and about 4 cm (1.6 in) long, and have black tips.

Right and left valve of the same specimen:

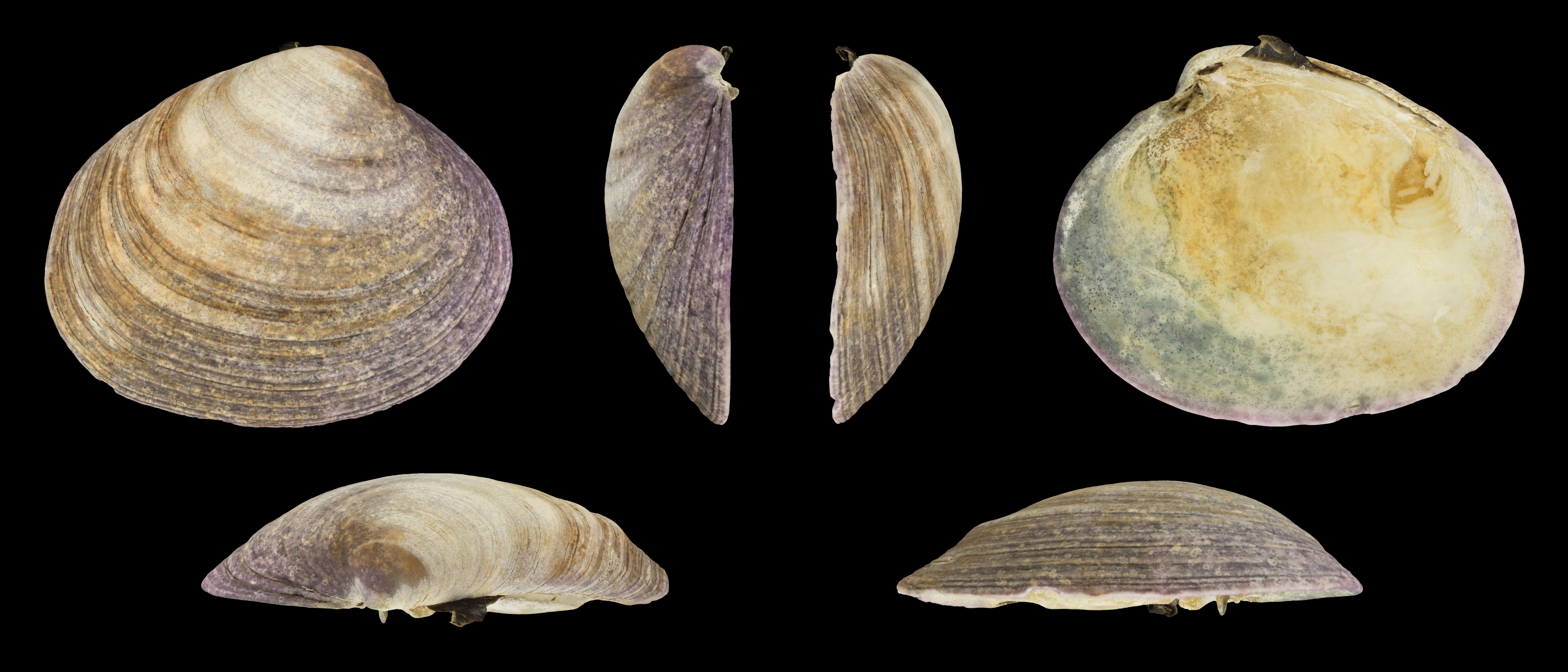
Right valve

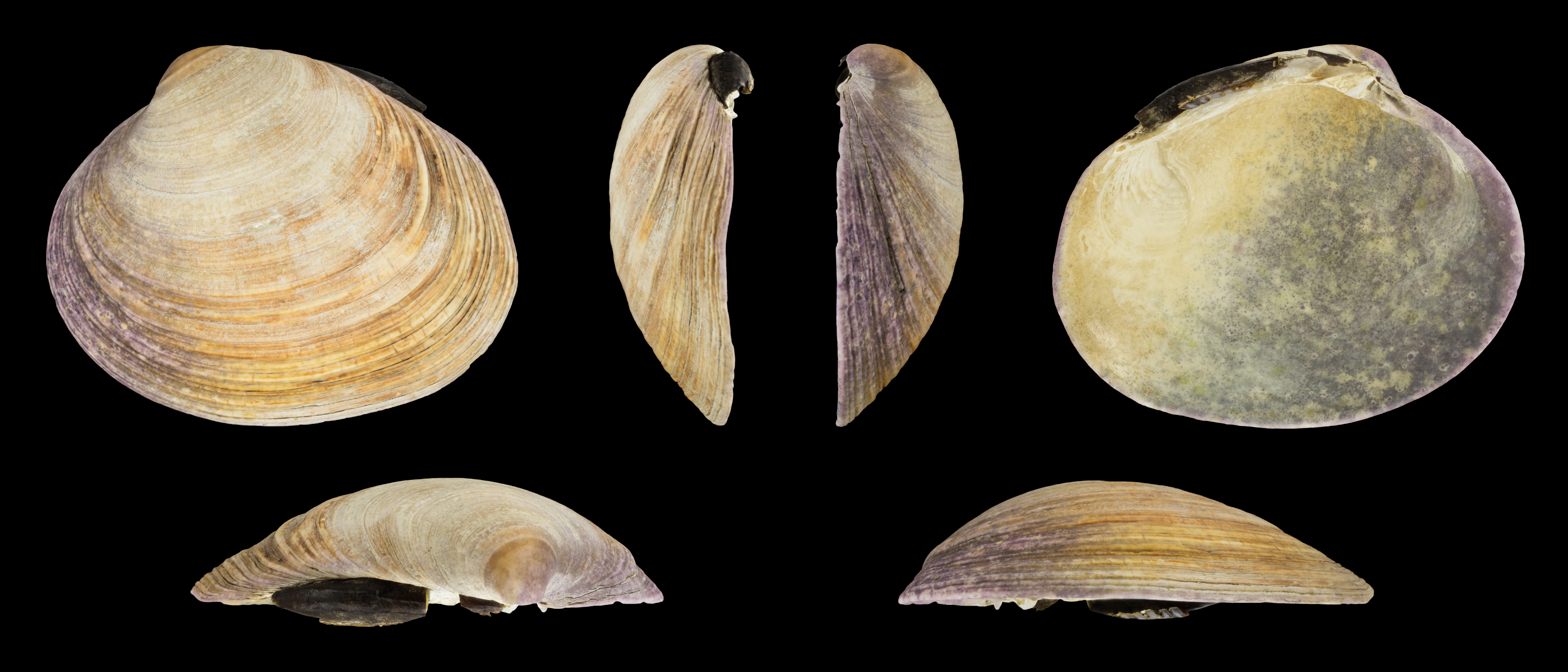
Left valve

== Distribution and habitat ==
S. gigantea is native to shallow waters in the northeastern Pacific Ocean. Its range extends from the Bering Sea and the Aleutian Islands southwards to San Francisco Bay in California, although it rarely occurs south of Humboldt Bay. It is found buried in soft sediments such as sand, muddy sand and gravel, from the low intertidal zone down to about 40 m (130 ft).

== Ecology ==
This clam lives buried in soft sediments, sometimes burrowing as deep as 35 cm (14 in) below the surface. It is a filter feeder and when feeding it extends its siphons to draw in a respiratory current of water, removes the phytoplankton and other planktonic organic particles, and expels the remaining water. Small pea crabs such as Pinnixa faba sometimes live symbiotically inside the mantle cavity, and the clam is preyed on by the larger Dungeness crab, the Lewis's moon snail, sunflower sea stars, mottled stars and sea otters.

=== Saxitoxins ===
Saxitoxins are a family of at least 21 neurotoxins produced by dinoflagellates that bioaccumulate in the clams and other bivalve mollusks as these algae are consumed and can cause paralytic shellfish poisoning (PSP) when the clams are eaten. According to a 1996 report from the Marine Advisory Program at the University of Alaska, the United States Food and Drug Administration (FDA) considers seafood unsafe if it contains more than 80 μg of PSP-causing toxins per 100 g of tissue of the seafood. It is clear that PSP-causing toxin levels are typically much higher in the summer months though this does not mean the seafood is necessarily safe at other times. Risks also vary based on species but seafood available for retail sale is required to meet the FDA standards. Although humans cannot detect the toxins in the tainted clams, it seems that sea otters and seabirds are able to do so, and avoid feeding on them.

In PSP poisonings that occurred in the summer of 1993 in Kodiak, Alaska, saxitoxin levels as high as 19,600 μg / 100 g were measured in the Alaskan blue mussel Mytilus edulis – sufficient to provide a lethal dose in a single 2.5 g mussel. By contrast, the highest measured level of saxitoxin in the Pacific littleneck clam Leukoma staminea was 580 μg / 100 g according to this 1996 report. Butter clams "tend to accumulate the highest levels of PSP toxins" with levels as high as 7,500 μg / 100 g having been recorded. The toxicity difference between these two clams can be attributed to the fact that the littleneck clam has an enzyme that converts saxitoxin into decarbamoylsaxitoxin, a capability that significantly reduces the quantity of saxitoxins present and that is not shared by the blue mussel nor by the butter clam.
