= Ferrimonas kyonanensis =

Scientific classification
- Domain: Bacteria
- Kingdom: Pseudomonadati
- Phylum: Pseudomonadota
- Class: Gammaproteobacteria
- Order: Alteromonadales
- Family: Ferrimonadaceae
- Genus: Ferrimonas
- Species: F. kyonanensis

Binomial name
- Ferrimonas kyonanensis Nakagawa et al. 2006

Type strain
- Asr22-7, DSM 18153, NBRC 101286

Synonyms
- Deselenobacterium kyonanesis

Species of bacterium

Ferrimonas kyonanensis is a facultatively anaerobic and mesophilic bacterium from the genus of Ferrimonas which has been isolated from the alimentary tract of a littleneck clam from the Tokyo Bay in Japan.
