= Ferrimonas balearica =

Scientific classification
- Domain: Bacteria
- Kingdom: Pseudomonadati
- Phylum: Pseudomonadota
- Class: Gammaproteobacteria
- Order: Alteromonadales
- Family: Ferrimonadaceae
- Genus: Ferrimonas
- Species: F. balearica

Binomial name
- Ferrimonas balearica Rosselló-Mora et al. 1996

Type strain
- CCM 4581, DSM 9799, PAT

Species of bacterium

Ferrimonas balearica is a Gram-negative, non-spore-forming, facultatively anaerobic bacterium from the genus of Ferrimonas which has been isolated from sediments from the harbor of Palma de Mallorca in Spain.
