= Ferrimonas marina =

Scientific classification
- Domain: Bacteria
- Kingdom: Pseudomonadati
- Phylum: Pseudomonadota
- Class: Gammaproteobacteria
- Order: Alteromonadales
- Family: Ferrimonadaceae
- Genus: Ferrimonas
- Species: F. marina

Binomial name
- Ferrimonas marina Katsuta et al. 2005

Type strain
- A4D-4, CIP 109004, DSM 16917, MBIC06480, NBRC 102583

Species of bacterium

Ferrimonas marina is a bacterium from the genus of Ferrimonas which has been isolated from alga from Okinawa in Japan.
