= Jan H. Landsberg =

British biologist, researcher and author (born 1954)

Jan H. Landsberg is a biologist, researcher, and author. Her professional research interests in biology have particular focus on aquatic animal and environmental health.

== Early life and education ==
Landsberg was born in London, England on 2 April 1954 and grew up in North Finchley, London. She currently resides in St. Petersburg, Florida, U.S.

Landsberg's early education took place in North Finchley, where she attended Comrie House elementary school, and high school, Woodhouse Grammar School. She received a BSc in Zoology from the University of Exeter, Exeter, England in 1975 and her Ph.D. (Biology) from Queen Mary College, University of London in 1981.

== Research ==
Landsberg currently works for the Florida Fish and Wildlife Conservation Commission

Landsberg has authored dozens of peer-reviewed papers including Effects of Harmful Algal Blooms on Aquatic Organisms, which was published in Reviews in Fisheries Science in 2002. The paper has been cited in over 1,000 papers. Much of her early research largely focused on coccidian and other parasites in fish. Additionally, she has researched fibropapillomatosis in Florida sea turtles. Landsberg is widely recognized for her work with biotoxins including the Florida red tide organism Karenia brevis.

Beginning in 2002, she was the agency lead on an investigation of human illness from consuming puffer fish caught in the Indian River Lagoon (IRL), in Florida. The investigation included the coordination of a multiagency (state, federal) team that identified, for the first time in the U.S., that saxitoxin was produced by the harmful algal bloom species Pyrodinium bahamense, and was the source of the poisonings. Saxitoxin in Florida pufferfish can be fatal to humans. The findings from this investigation led to the closure of the pufferfish fishery in the IRL and the continuing monitoring of shellfish beds to ensure they are not contaminated with the toxin.

Landsberg is currently involved in two major multi-partner collaborative research investigations in estuaries and coastal areas in Florida. The first is to determine why manatees have been dying in the IRL since 2013. The second is to identify the cause of a major unidentified disease(s) affecting multiple species of corals in the Florida reefs. The diseases are having a major impact and killing thousands of corals. It is a national and international issue.

== Writing ==
Landsberg's interest in the environment and sciences extends to her work as a writer. Her writing focuses on nature's mysteries and myths.

Her first novel, The Curse of the Crystal Kuatzin was published in 2013. In 2014, the book received a Gold from the Literary Classics International Book Awards and Reviews in the Young Adult Fiction category, and was a finalist in the 2014 Dante Rossetti Award in the Young Adult Novels category.

Her second book, an exposé of UFOs and their origin, UFOs Unmasked, was published in August 2018.
