= Paraferrimonas haliotis =

Scientific classification
- Domain: Bacteria
- Kingdom: Pseudomonadati
- Phylum: Pseudomonadota
- Class: Gammaproteobacteria
- Order: Alteromonadales
- Family: Ferrimonadaceae
- Genus: Paraferrimonas
- Species: P. haliotis

Binomial name
- Paraferrimonas haliotis Huang et al. 2017

Type strain
- KCTC 52632, MCCC 1A11748, NBRC 112785, AFRC7-2-1, CFD7-4-2

Species of bacterium

Paraferrimonas haliotis is an iron-reducing, Gram-negative, facultatively anaerobic and stick-shaped bacterium from the genus of Paraferrimonas which has been isolated from the intestine tract of an abalone Haliotis discus.
