= Ferrimonas pelagia =

Scientific classification
- Domain: Bacteria
- Kingdom: Pseudomonadati
- Phylum: Pseudomonadota
- Class: Gammaproteobacteria
- Order: Alteromonadales
- Family: Ferrimonadaceae
- Genus: Ferrimonas
- Species: F. pelagia

Binomial name
- Ferrimonas pelagia Yim et al. 2013

Type strain
- CBA4601, JCM 18401, KACC 16695, KCTC 32029

Species of bacterium

Ferrimonas pelagia is a Gram-negative bacterium from the genus of Ferrimonas which has been isolated from seawater from the Jeju Island in Korea.
