= Paraferrimonas sedimenticola =

Scientific classification
- Domain: Bacteria
- Kingdom: Pseudomonadati
- Phylum: Pseudomonadota
- Class: Gammaproteobacteria
- Order: Alteromonadales
- Family: Ferrimonadaceae
- Genus: Paraferrimonas
- Species: P. sedimenticola

Binomial name
- Paraferrimonas sedimenticola Khan and Harayama 2007

Type strain
- CIP 109284, NBRC 101628, Mok-106

Synonyms
- Aeribaculum roseum

Species of bacterium

Paraferrimonas sedimenticola is a bacterium from the genus of Paraferrimonas which has been isolated from sediments from the coast of Okinawa Island in Japan.
