= Ferrimonas sediminum =

Scientific classification
- Domain: Bacteria
- Kingdom: Pseudomonadati
- Phylum: Pseudomonadota
- Class: Gammaproteobacteria
- Order: Alteromonadales
- Family: Ferrimonadaceae
- Genus: Ferrimonas
- Species: F. sediminum

Binomial name
- Ferrimonas sediminum Ji et al. 2013

Type strain
- DSM 23317, JYr13, LMG 2556

Species of bacterium

Ferrimonas sediminum is a Gram-negative and facultatively anaerobic bacterium from the genus of Ferrimonas which has been isolated from sediments of an amphioxus breeding zone from Qingdao in China.
