= Ferrimonas senticii =

Scientific classification
- Domain: Bacteria
- Kingdom: Pseudomonadati
- Phylum: Pseudomonadota
- Class: Gammaproteobacteria
- Order: Alteromonadales
- Family: Ferrimonadaceae
- Genus: Ferrimonas
- Species: F. senticii

Binomial name
- Ferrimonas senticii Campbell et al. 2007

Type strain
- ATCC BAA-1480, DSM 18821, P2S11

Species of bacterium

Ferrimonas senticii is a bacterium from the genus of Ferrimonas which has been isolated from slime of the fish Arothron hispidus from the Kaneohe Bay in the United States.
