= Ferrimonas gelatinilytica =

Scientific classification
- Domain: Bacteria
- Kingdom: Pseudomonadati
- Phylum: Pseudomonadota
- Class: Gammaproteobacteria
- Order: Alteromonadales
- Family: Ferrimonadaceae
- Genus: Ferrimonas
- Species: F. gelatinilytica

Binomial name
- Ferrimonas gelatinilytica Rahman and Cha 2013

Type strain
- CJ24, MMH2-4, JCM 18720, KACC 17065

Species of bacterium

Ferrimonas gelatinilytica is a Gram-negative, facultatively anaerobic and motile bacterium from the genus of Ferrimonas which has been isolated from tidal flat sediments from the Yellow Sea in Korea.
