= Decarbamoylsaxitoxin =

- Structure of dcSTX

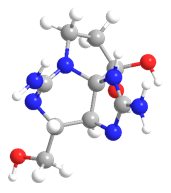
Ball and stick model of dcSTX
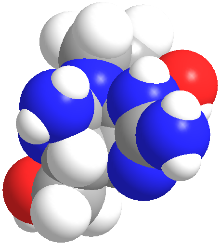
Space filling molecule of dcSTX

Names
- IUPAC name (3aS,4R,10aS)-2,6-diamino-4-(hydroxymethyl)-3a,4,8,9-tetrahydro-3H-pyrrolo[1,2-c]purine-10,10-diol

Identifiers
CAS Number	58911-04-9
3D model (JSmol)	Interactive image
ChemSpider	19975972
KEGG	C20021
PubChem CID	24941628
UNII	EC89AU638S
CompTox Dashboard (EPA)	DTXSID70207660
- InChI: InChI=1S/C9H16N6O3/c10-6-13-5-4(3-16)12-7(11)15-2-1-8(17,18)9(5,15)14-6/h4-5,16-18H,1-3H2,(H2,11,12)(H3,10,13,14)/t4-,5-,9-/m0/s1 Key: VRRIYZJUSNMZMP-PJPYAQQDSA-N
- SMILES: NC1=N[C@H]2[C@H](CO)N=C(N)N3CCC(O)(O)[C@]23N1

Properties
Chemical formula	C_{9}H_{16}N_{6}O_{3}
Molar mass	256.26 g/mol
- Except where otherwise noted, data are given for materials in their standard state (at 25 °C [77 °F], 100 kPa). Infobox references

Decarbamoylsaxitoxin, abbreviated as dcSTX, is a neurotoxin which is naturally produced in dinoflagellate. DcSTX is one of the many analogues of saxitoxin (STX).

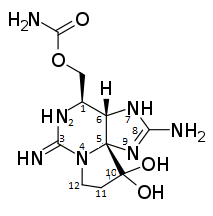
Figure 1: the structure of saxitoxin, with numbered carbons. Decarbamoylsaxitoxin is one of the derivatives of saxitoxin, which only has a CH_{2}OH group on carbon 1. Also, a double bond between carbon 2 and 3 is added.

Saxitoxin is a tricyclic alkaloid compound, which has multiple structural related neurotoxins. One of those related neurotoxins is neosaxitoxin (NSTX) in which the nitrogen at position 2 is not bound to a hydrogen, but to a hydroxyl group. Another toxic analogue of saxitoxin is gonyautoxin (GTX). The difference between GTX and STX is that on the carbon at position 11, a hydrogensulfate is bound.

Between dcSTX, NSTX and GTX, dcSTX is the one which varies most from saxitoxin. In dcSTX there is a double bond between carbons 2 and 3, while there is a single bond in STX. This also results in that the double-bonded N to carbon number 3 in STX, is a single bound NH_{2} in dcSTX. Another difference between decarbamoylsaxitoxin and saxitoxin is that the amino-carbonyl-oxy-methyl group at position 1 in STX, is only a CH_{2}OH group in dcSTX.

Even though there are slight differences between all saxitoxin-related compounds, all those saxitoxins are neurotoxins which affect the sodium channels. When in contact with one of the saxitoxins it can cause a severe illness, which is known as paralytic shellfish poisoning (PSP).

== Source in nature ==
From eating shellfish, under which mussels, clams, whelks and scallops, multiple illnesses can result. One of them is sensory and motor paralysis, known as paralytic shellfish poisoning (PSP), which results from ingestion of saxitoxin and its derivatives, such as decarbamoylsaxitoxin. Shellfish can concentrate a dinoflagellate known as Gonyaulax tamarensis, which elaborates saxitoxin. Mussels are known to filter up to 20 litres of water a day, which is why they are very likely to carry the toxin when the surrounding water is contaminated. This dinoflagellate does not affect the shellfish, but when an organism eats the scallop shuckings, it risks getting poisoned. Some species, such as the littleneck clam, possess an enzyme that converts saxitoxin into decarbamoylsaxitoxin, which reportedly decreases the toxicity to humans of the saxitoxins present.

== Structure and synthesis ==
=== Structure and properties ===
Synonyms of decarbamoylsaxitoxin are; dcSTX-saxitoxin, decarbamoylsaxitoxin, decarbamylsaxitoxin

=== Synthesis ===
Decarbamoylsaxitocin is like saxitoxin a very hygroscopic solid. Since saxitoxins and their derivatives are mainly produced by the Gonyaulax tamarensis dinoflagellate, for a long time the exact synthesis pathway was unknown. Saxitoxin was the first paralytic shellfish toxin for which a total synthesis was described. This was done by Kishi and his research group in 1977. In 1991 they managed to describe the synthesis of decarbamoylsaxitoxin as well.

== Metabolism ==
Decarbamoylsaxitoxin enters the body via the mouth. There it can be absorbed through the mucosa, and later on it can be absorbed through the small intestine. After absorption, the toxin is distributed through the body water. It gets removed by the kidneys and is excreted via urine.

An exact biotransformation of decarbamoylsaxitoxin is not known yet. In 2004, a study on people who died from paralytic shellfish poisoning reported detected oxidation of saxitoxin into neosaxitoxin.

In a more recent study on human liver samples, a metabolic pathway was proposed for saxitoxin which is shown in figure 2. They found that saxitoxin can be converted into neosaxitoxin in the human body, which harmonizes the earlier research. The neosaxitoxin will however be converted further into either a sugar-binding state or into GTX4/GTX1, a pair of gonyautotoxin epimers. These epimers can be converted to a sugar-binding state as well. Also, the sugar-bound state of saxitoxin can be formed. As this study shows, the phase II conjugation reaction is a very common glucuronidation reaction. Due to this, the substance gets more hydrophilic which makes it more easily excretable.

Even though this study was done on saxitoxin exclusively, it is very likely that the metabolic pathway of decarbamoylsaxitoxin will be the same, since the major structural difference between them is the shown OONH_{2} substituent, indicated with a yellow circle in the figure, which is a hydroxyl substituent in decarbamoylsaxitoxin. This group is not affected in the proposed metabolism and will most likely not interrupt the shown mechanism.

== Mechanisms of action ==
Decarbamoylsaxitoxin is a known neurotoxin, which mechanism is based on that of saxitoxin. Both namely bind to sodium channels, as shown in figure 3 Sodium channels contain negative residues at the top of their pore. These negatively charged residues are part of the filter for sodium. Decarbamoylsaxitoxin contains two guanidine substructures which can be protonated easily. Protonation of the guanidine substructures leads to a positive charge on the decarbamoylsaxitoxin and because of this positive charge the decarbamoylsaxitoxin can bind to the sodium channels. This binding to sodium channels prevents sodium passing through the channel. Because sodium passage is blocked, the channel cannot fulfil its function and it will be impossible to generate an action potential in the cell with the blocked sodium channels. There has been a study performed on which sodium channels are mainly targeted by the neurotoxin. This study showed that the neuromuscular transmission in the motor axon and the muscular membrane is targeted whereas the end-plate is left unaffected. It also showed that the atrioventicular node is the main target inside the heart. The consequences of decarbamoylsaxitoxin are paralysis and death. In vitro tests declared decarbamoylsaxitoxin more toxic than saxitoxin. It is not clear why this is the case; it can be speculated that it is caused by the alcohol group that is present on decarbamoylsaxitoxin instead of the amide group on saxitoxin. However, what can be concluded for sure is that decarbamoylsaxitoxin is converted into other compounds in the body or has trouble reaching the sodium channels. In vivo tests declared decarbamoylsaxitoxin half as toxic as saxitoxin.

== Illness and poisoning ==
=== Toxicology ===
In coastal waters, mostly in temperate and subtropical regions, dinoflagellate blooms can occur when the conditions for growth and aggregation are optimal. They cause so called ‘red tides’ or ‘red waters’ and the concentration of toxic can be of great risk for both marine life and humans. However, also when the water is clear shellfish can contain toxins, which are not destroyed by heating or freezing. In case of a red tide, a mussel can contain as much as 180 g of toxin. To human, a dose of only 1 mg saxitoxin can be fatal. Worldwide the limits for toxins in shellfish which cause paralytic shellfish poisoning is set at 80 μg per 100 g of meat.

=== Illness in humans ===
Usually, within minutes of ingestion of the poisoned shellfish, paranesthesia of the oral region and fingertips are noticed. This gradually proceeds to the neck, arms, legs and toes, together with general muscular incoordination. Patients can start feeling numb, due to which it is hard to make voluntary movements. Also symptoms as dizziness, weakness and incoherence can occur. In the final stage of the poisoning, respiratory distress and full muscular paralysis occur, usually between 2 and 12 hours after ingestion.

The symptoms are sometimes difficult to interpret, since they are also associated with drunkenness. Alcohol can increase the severity of symptoms.

=== Treatment ===
There is no antidote to paralytic shellfish poisoning. However, with proper medical care, most patients will survive. The most important in treatment is assistance of the patient with ventilation. Also alkaline and sodium-containing fluids can be used to block the effect of paralytic shellfish toxins on nerve conduction.

== See also ==
- Saxitoxin
- Gonyautoxin
- Neosaxitoxin
- Paralytic Shellfish Poisoning (PSP)
- Sodium channels
