= Certified reference materials =

Material traceability inspection

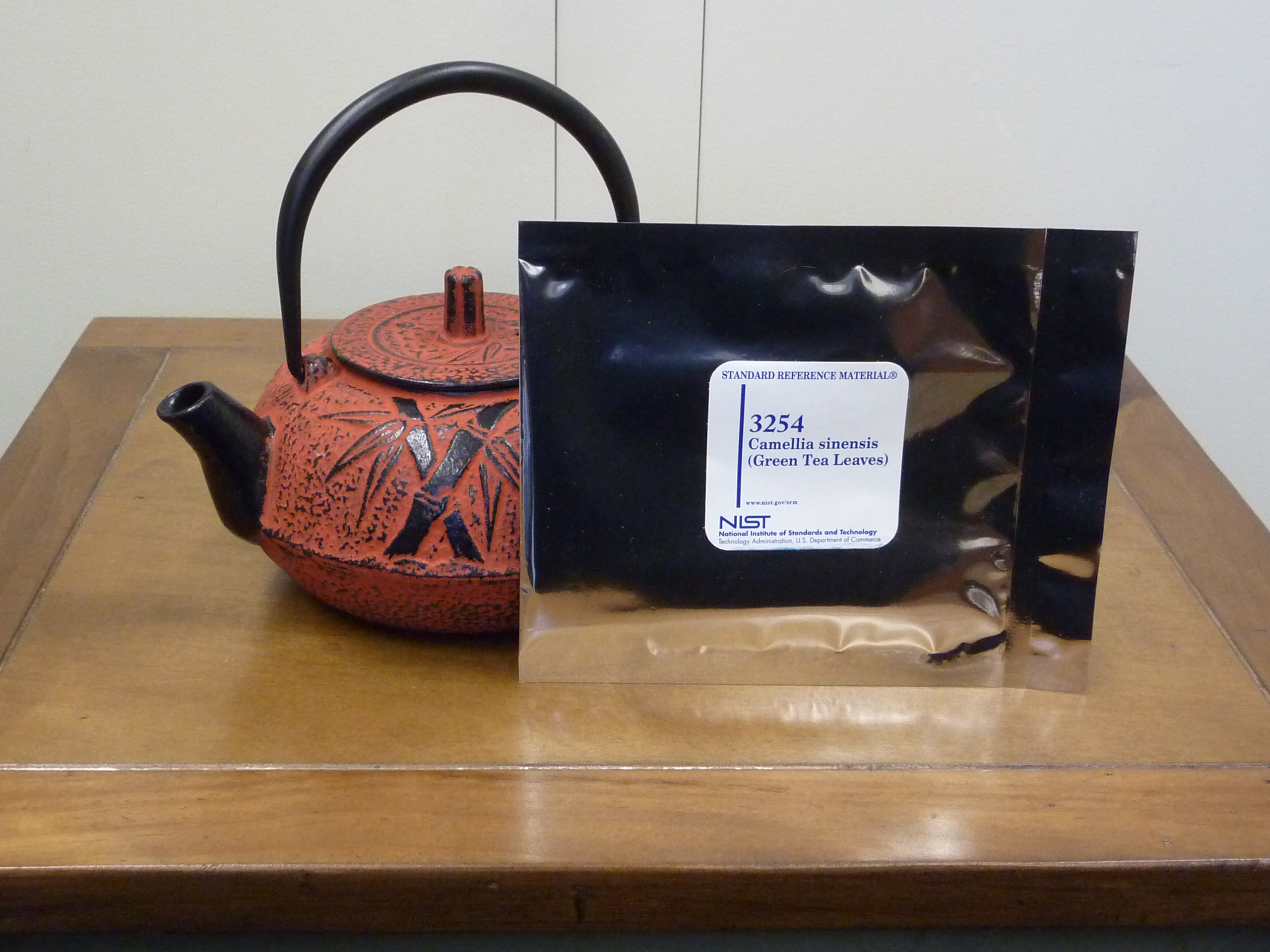
Green Tea standard reference

Certified reference materials (CRMs) are 'controls' or standards used to check the quality and metrological traceability of products, to validate analytical measurement methods, or for the calibration of instruments. A certified reference material is a particular form of measurement standard.

Reference materials are particularly important for analytical chemistry and clinical analysis. Since most analytical instrumentation is comparative, it requires a sample of known composition (reference material) for accurate calibration. These reference materials are produced under stringent manufacturing procedures and differ from laboratory reagents in their certification and the traceability of the data provided.

Quality management systems involving laboratory accreditation under national and international accreditation/certification standards such as ISO/IEC 17025 require metrological traceability to Certified Reference Materials (where possible) when using reference materials for calibration.

Certified Reference Materials are preferred where available. However, their availability is limited. Reference Materials that do not meet all the criteria for certified reference materials are more widely available: the principal difference is the additional evidence of metrological traceability and statement of measurement uncertainty provided on the certificate for certified reference materials.

== Terminology ==
NIST Standard Reference Materials catalog 1992-93

=== ISO REMCO definitions ===
ISO REMCO, the ISO committee responsible for guidance on reference materials within ISO, defines the following classes of reference material:

Reference Material
Material, sufficiently homogeneous and stable with respect to one or more specified properties, which has been established to be fit for its intended use in a measurement process.
Certified Reference Material
Reference material characterized by a metrologically valid procedure for one or more specified properties, accompanied by a certificate that provides the value of the specified property, its associated uncertainty, and a statement of metrological traceability.

=== Alternative terminology ===
Other bodies may define classes of reference material differently. WHO guidelines for biological (Note: The term "Biological" as used by WHO is discussed in WHO report 932 Annex 2) reference materials provide the terms: (Note: Descriptions have been shortened from the original text)

- Reference standards: materials that are used as calibrators in assays
- International biological measurement standard: a biological substance provided to enable the results of biological assay or immunological assay procedures to be expressed in the same way throughout the world
- Secondary reference standards: Reference standards calibrated against and traceable to primary WHO materials and intended for use in routine tests
- Reference reagent: a WHO reference standard, the activity of which is defined by WHO in terms of a unit

For chemical substances some pharmacopoeias use the WHO terms

- Primary chemical reference substance: a chemical reference substance ... whose value is accepted without requiring comparison to another chemical substance.
- Secondary chemical reference substance: substance whose characteristics are assigned and/or calibrated by comparison with a primary chemical reference substance.

The United States National Institute of Standards and Technology (NIST) uses the trade marked term Standard Reference Material (SRM) to denote a certified reference material that satisfies additional NIST-specific criteria. In addition, commercial producers adhering to criteria and protocols defined by NIST may use the trademark "NIST traceable reference material" to designate certified reference materials with a well-defined traceability linkage to existing NIST standards for chemical measurements.

== Types of reference material ==
ILAC describes the following five types of reference material:

1. Pure substances; essentially pure chemicals, characterised for chemical purity and/or trace impurities.
2. Standard solutions and gas mixtures, often prepared gravimetrically from pure substances.
3. Matrix reference materials, characterised for the composition of specified major, minor or trace chemical constituents. Such materials may be prepared from matrices containing the components of interest, or by preparing synthetic mixtures.
4. Physico-chemical reference materials, characterised for properties such as melting point, viscosity, or optical density.
5. Reference objects or artifacts, characterised for functional properties such as taste, odour, octane number, flash point and hardness. This type also includes microscopy specimens characterised for properties ranging from fibre type to microbiological specimens.

== Production ==
=== Principal steps in producing certified reference materials ===
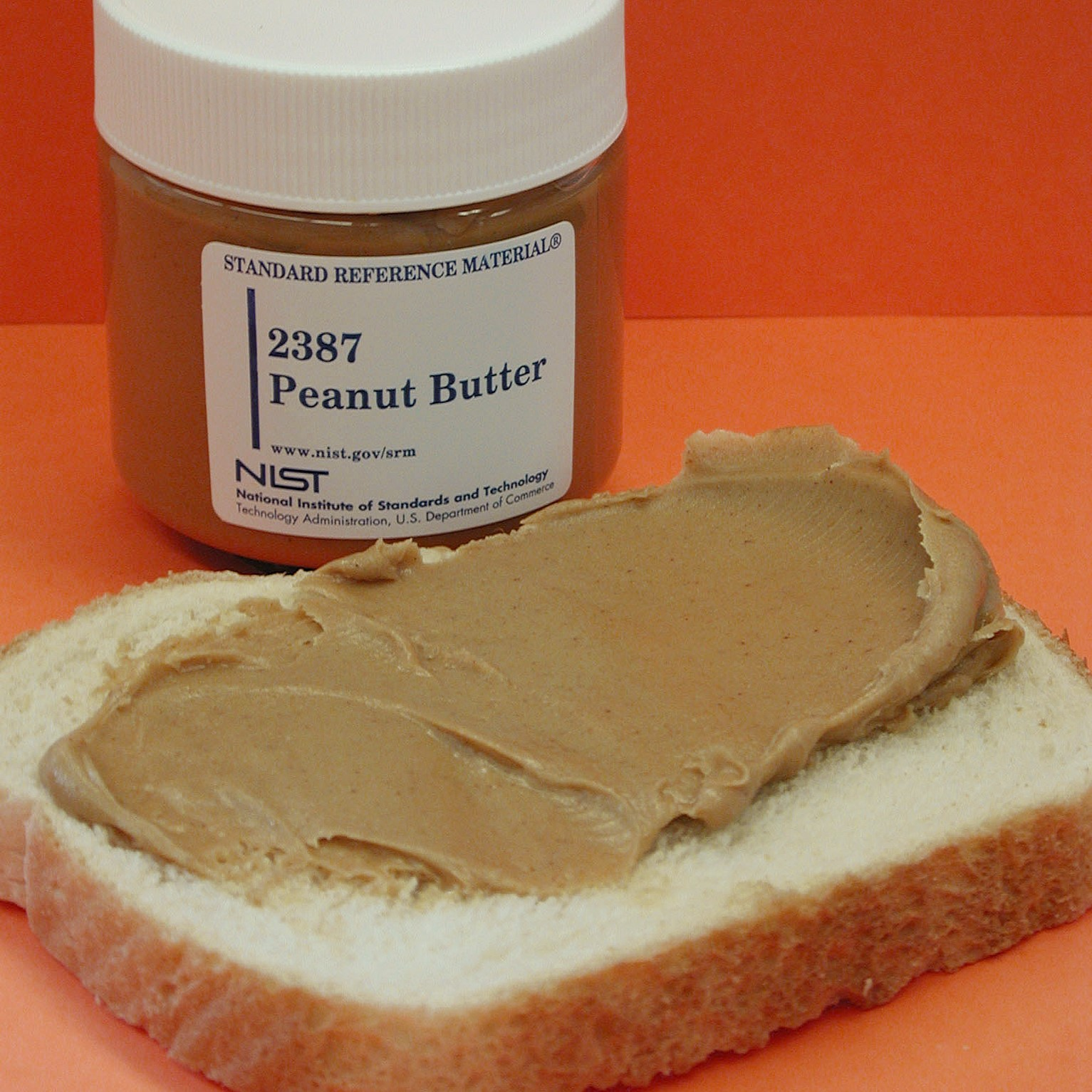
Standard reference peanut butter.

The preparation of certified reference materials is described in general in ISO Guide 17034 and in more detail in ISO Guide 35. Preparation of biological reference standards is described in WHO Guidance. General steps required in production of a certified reference material typically include:

- Collection or synthesis of material
- Sample preparation (including homogenization, stabilization, bottling etc.)
- Homogeneity testing
- Stability assessment
- Value assignment ("characterization" in ISO REMCO terms).

In addition it may be important to assess the commutability of a reference material; this is especially important for biological materials.

=== Sample preparation ===
Detailed sample preparation depends on the type of material. Pure standards are most likely to be prepared by chemical synthesis and purification and characterized by determination of remaining impurities. This is often done by commercial producers. Natural matrix CRMs (often shortened to 'matrix CRMs') contain an analyte or analytes in a natural sample (for, example, lead in fish tissue). These are typically produced by homogenization of a naturally occurring material followed by measurement of each analyte. Due to the difficulty in production and value assignment, these are usually produced by national or transnational metrology institutes like NIST (USA), BAM (Germany), KRISS (Korea) and EC JRC ( European Commission Joint Research Centre).

For natural materials, homogenization is often critical; natural materials are rarely homogeneous on the scale of grams so production of a solid natural matrix reference material typically involves processing to a fine powder or paste. Homogenization can have adverse effects, for example on proteins, so producers must take care not to over-process materials. Stability of a certified reference material is also important, so a range of strategies may be used to prepare a reference material that is more stable than the natural material it is prepared from. For example, stabilizing agents such as antioxidants or antimicrobial agents may be added to prevent degradation, liquids containing certified concentrations of trace metals may have pH adjusted to keep metals in solution, and clinical reference materials may be freeze-dried for long term storage if they can be reconstituted successfully.

Three steps in producing a natural water CRM
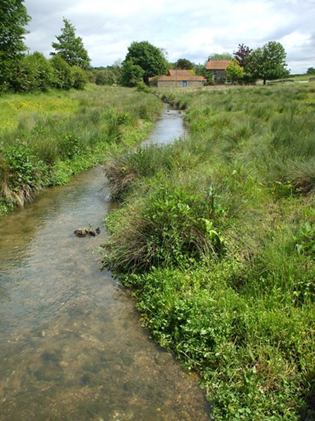
Source: a natural stream

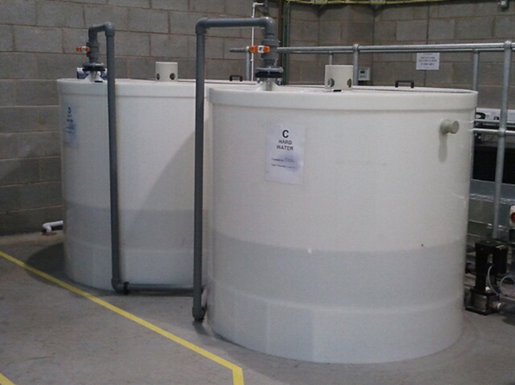
Homogenization and filtration

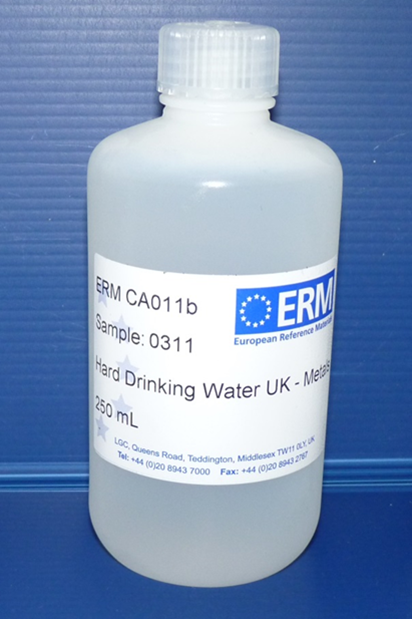
The bottled CRM

=== Homogeneity testing ===
Homogeneity testing for a candidate reference material typically involves replicated measurements on multiple units or subsamples of the material.

Homogeneity tests for CRMs follow planned experimental designs. Because the experiment is intended to test for (or estimate the size of) variation in value between different CRM units, the designs are chosen to allow separation of variation in results due to random measurement error and variation due to differences between units of the CRM. Among the simplest designs recommended for this purpose is a simple balanced nested design (see schematic).

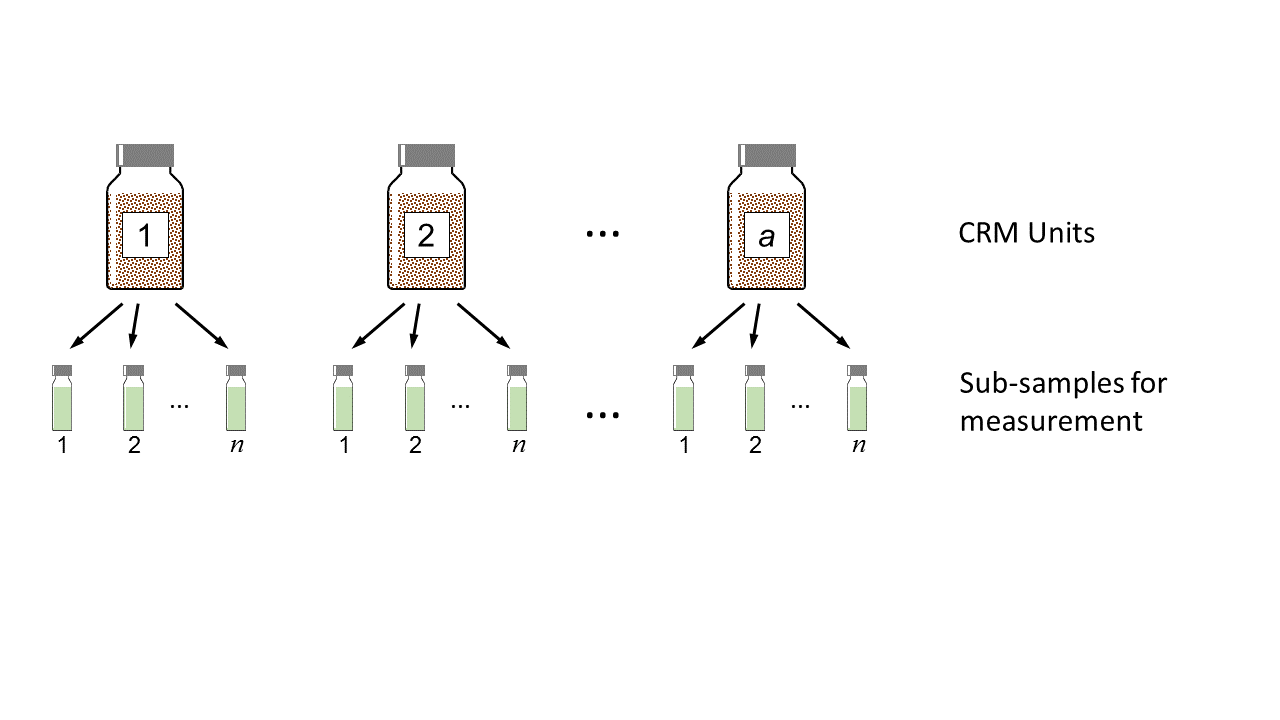
Schematic of a balanced nested design for a CRM homogeneity test. Large bottles show packaged individual CRM units; small vials show subsamples prepared for measurement.

Typically 10-30 CRM units are taken from the batch at random; stratified random sampling is recommended so that the selected units are spread across the batch. An equal number of subsamples (usually two or three) is then taken from each CRM unit and measured. Subsamples are measured in random order. Other designs, such as randomized block designs, have also been used for CRM certification.

Data processing for homogeneity tests usually involves a statistical significance test for evidence of differences between units of the candidate CRM. For the simple balanced design above, this typically uses an F test following ANOVA. A check for trends with production order is also recommended. This approach is not taken in ISO Guide 35:2017; rather, emphasis is placed on deciding whether the between-unit standard deviation is sufficiently small for the intended end use. If statistical tests are used, however, the homogeneity experiment should be capable of detecting important heterogeneity, ISO Guide 35:2017 in turn requiring a sufficient combination of precision of the measurement procedure, number of RM units and number of replicates per unit. Statistical power calculations can assist in ensuring a sufficiently effective test .

In extreme cases, such as microanalysis, materials must be checked for homogeneity on sub-micron scales; this may involve much larger numbers of observations and adjustments to statistical analysis.

=== Stability assessment ===
==== Stability assessment and testing strategies ====
Stability is among the essential properties of a CRM (see definitions above), and stability assessment is accordingly required for certified reference materials. Stability under long term storage and also under conditions of transport are both expected to be assessed. "Assessment" is not synonymous with "testing"; some materials - for example, many minerals and metal alloys - may be so stable that experimental tests are not considered necessary. Other reference materials will usually undergo experimental tests of stability at some point prior to the material being distributed for sale. Where reference materials are certified for more than one property, stability is expected to be demonstrated for every certified property.

There are two important strategies for CRM stability testing; simple real-time studies and accelerated testing. Real-time studies simply keep units of the material at their planned storage temperature for a suitable period of time and observe the material at intervals. Accelerated studies use a range of more stringent conditions, most commonly increased temperature, to test whether the material is likely to be stable over longer time scales.

==== Real-time stability studies ====
Real-time stability studies simply hold a set of RM units at a proposed storage temperature and test a proportion of them at regular intervals. The results are usually assessed by inspection and by linear regression to determine whether there is a significant change in measured value over time.

==== Accelerated stability studies ====
Accelerated studies have been in use since at least the mid-1950s, at least for biological reference materials. CRMs are typically monitored at a range of temperatures and the results are used to predict the rate of change at a proposed, usually low, storage temperature. Often, the prediction uses a well known degradation model such as an Arrhenius model. The advantage over real-time studies is that results are available sooner and predictions of stability over a much longer period than the stability study can be defended. For some applications, accelerated studies have been described as the only practical approach:

In the absence of a reference method or a higher order standard, ... accelerated studies under stress conditions provide the only approach for assessment of stability

— World Health Organization

The principal disadvantage of accelerated studies is that reference materials, like any other material, can degrade for unexpected reasons over time, or can degrade following different kinetic models; predictions can then become unreliable.

==== Isochronous studies ====
In most stability studies, real-time or accelerated, a few units of the reference material are tested at intervals. If the measurement system used for testing the materials is not perfectly stable, this can generate imprecise data or can be mistaken for instability of the material. To overcome these difficulties, it is often possible to move RM units, at intervals, to some reference temperature where they remain stable, and then test all the accumulated units - which have undergone different exposure times - at the same time. This is referred to as an isochronous study. This strategy has the advantage of improving the precision of data used in assessing stability at the cost of delaying results until the end of the stability study period.

== See also ==
- Canadian Reference Materials
- Geological and Environmental Reference Materials (GeoReM) Database
- National Institute of Standards and Technology (NIST)
- National Institute of Advanced Industrial Science and Technology (AIST)
