= Ferrimonas =

Scientific classification
- Domain: Bacteria
- Kingdom: Pseudomonadati
- Phylum: Pseudomonadota
- Class: Gammaproteobacteria
- Order: Alteromonadales
- Family: Ferrimonadaceae
- Genus: Ferrimonas; Rosselló-Mora et al. 1996

Type species
- Ferrimonas balearica

Species
- F. balearica F. futtsuensis F. gelatinilytica F. kyonanensis F. marina F. pelagia F. sediminum F. senticii

Genus of bacteria

Ferrimonas is a genus of bacteria from the family of Ferrimonadaceae.
