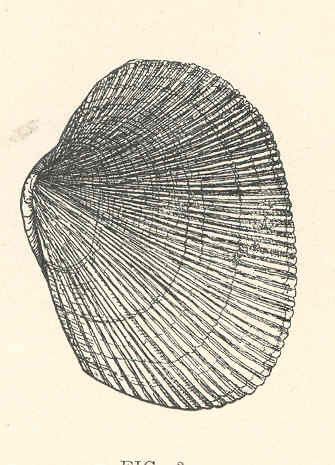

Scientific classification
- Kingdom: Animalia
- Phylum: Mollusca
- Class: Bivalvia
- Order: Venerida
- Superfamily: Veneroidea
- Family: Veneridae
- Genus: Leukoma
- Species: L. staminea

Binomial name
- Leukoma staminea (Conrad, 1837)

Synonyms
- Chione ruderata Deshayes, 1853; Paphia staminea (Conrad, 1837); Paphia staminea orbella Carpenter, 1864; Paphia staminea var. sulculosa Dall, 1902; Protothaca grewingkii Dall, 1904; Protothaca staminea (Conrad, 1837); Tapes diversa G. B. Sowerby II, 1852; Tapes tumida G. B. Sowerby II, 1852; Tapes tumida Carpenter, 1857; Venerupis petiti Deshayes, 1839; Venus ampliata Carpenter, 1857; Venus conradi Römer, 1867; Venus mundulus Reeve, 1863; Venus pectunculoides Valenciennes, 1846; Venus rigida Gould, 1850; Venus staminea Conrad, 1837

= Leukoma staminea =

Littleneck clam

Species of bivalve

Leukoma staminea, commonly known as the Pacific littleneck clam, the littleneck clam, the rock cockle, the hardshell clam, the Tomales Bay cockle, the rock clam or the ribbed carpet shell, is a species of bivalve mollusc in the family Veneridae. This species of mollusc was exploited by early humans in North America; for example, the Chumash peoples of Central California harvested these clams in Morro Bay approximately 1,000 years ago, and the distinctive shells form middens near their settlements.

== Description ==
Like other members of Veneridae, this species has a chalky shell, the umbo being anterior to the midline of the shell, but closer to the midline than to the anterior end of the shell. The two equal-sized valves are oval or heart-shaped. The width of the shell is greater than a quarter of its length, and the shell seldom exceeds 6 cm (2.4 in) in length. The umbones point towards the anterior end of the shell. The hinge has three cardinal teeth in each valve, and a row of small teeth along the ventral margins of the valves. There are numerous concentric ridges, more clearly demarcked at the anterior end, but the radial ridges are often more clearly sculpted. The foot is large and there is a clearcut pallial sinus.

Right and left valve of the same specimen:

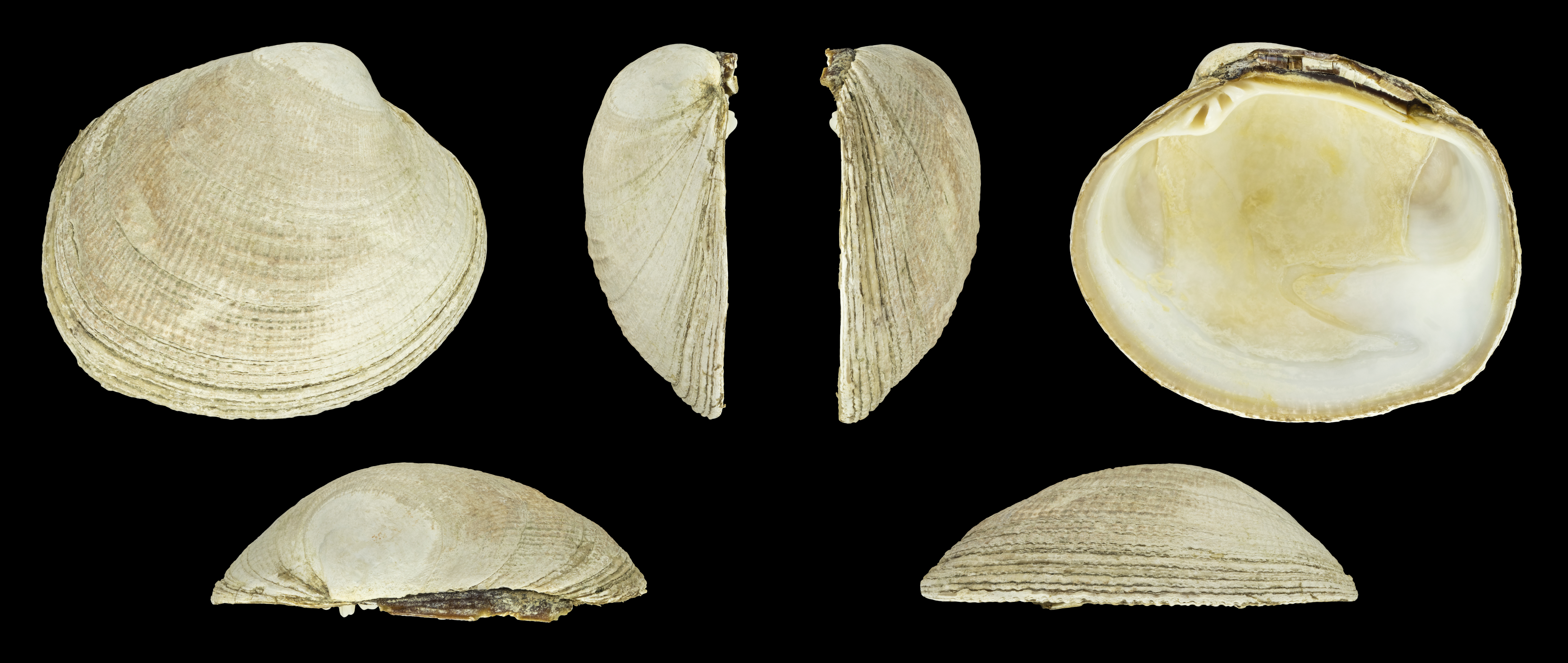
Right valve

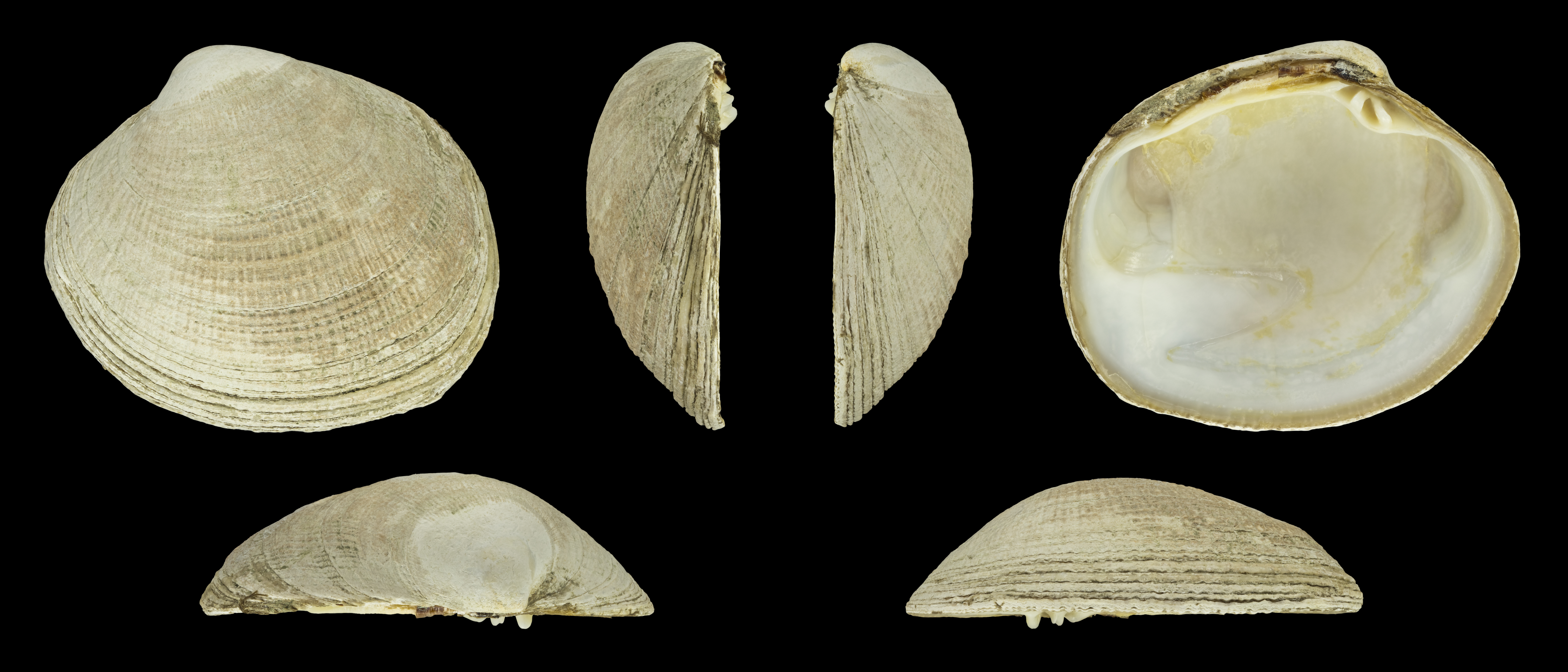
Left valve

== Distribution and habitat ==
Leukoma staminea is native to the eastern Pacific Ocean. Its range extends along the coasts of North America from the Aleutian Islands and Alaska in the north to Baja California in the south. It usually occurs in protected areas on sand, hard mud and clayey-gravel substrates from the mid and lower shore down to depths of about 10 m (33 ft), usually buried less than 8 cm (3 in) beneath the surface of the sediment. Occasionally it is in more exposed locations, in gravel-filled cracks in rocks or in empty burrows of other clams.

== Ecology ==
This clam is a filter feeder and consumes microscopic algae such as dinoflagellates, diatoms, and cyanobacteria. Some dinoflagellates produce neurotoxins, such as saxitoxin and its derivates, that bioaccumulate in the clams and other bivalve mollusks and can cause paralytic shellfish poisoning (PSP) when the clams are eaten. Despite this fact, the clam was eaten by Native Americans and is still used as a food for humans. According to a 1996 report from the Marine Advisory Program at the University of Alaska, the United States Food and Drug Administration (FDA) considers seafood unsafe if it contains more than 80 μg of PSP-causing toxins per 100 g of tissue of the seafood. PSP is caused by a mixture of at least 21 different chemical species, some of which undergo chemical transformations within the dinoflagellates or within the animals that acquire the saxitoxins, and which are retained by different animals for different lengths of time. It is clear that PSP-causing toxin levels are typically much higher in the summer months though this does not mean the seafood is necessarily safe at other times. Risks also vary based on species but seafood available for retail sale is required to meet the FDA standards.

In PSP poisonings that occurred in the summer of 1993 in Kodiak, Alaska, saxitoxin levels as high as 19,600 μg / 100 g were measured in the Alaska blue mussel Mytilus edulis – sufficient to provide a lethal dose in a single 2.5 g mussel. By contrast, the highest measured level of saxitoxin in the Pacific littleneck clam was 580 μg / 100 g according to this 1996 report. Littleneck clams are "typically less toxic and retain their toxins for a shorter amount of time than the other species" such as "butter clams and blue mussels [that] tend to accumulate the highest levels of PSP toxins ... [and] geoducks and scallops [that] tend to be toxic for longer periods of time" but this does not mean that these clams "are always safe to eat [as] you can get PSP from littleneck clams." The reason for the difference is likely that the littleneck clam has an enzyme that converts saxitoxin into decarbamoylsaxitoxin, a capability not shared by the blue mussel nor by the butter clam Saxidomus gigantea (in which levels of saxitoxin as high as 7,750 μg / 100 g have been reported). This transformation to decarbomyl derivative has been reported in some other clam species and significantly reduces the toxicity of saxitoxins present.

Predators include such molluscs as the leafy hornmouth snail (Ceratostoma foliatum) and Lewis's moon snail (Neverita lewisii), the crabs Metacarcinus magister and Cancer productus, the giant Pacific octopus (Enteroctopus dofleini) and the sea otter. Fish such as the Pacific staghorn sculpin sometimes nips off the siphons when they are extended to feed. This clam spawns during the summer in the north of its range. It is a slow-growing species and may live for up to sixteen years.
