= Gonyautoxin =

Gonyautoxin 2

Names
- IUPAC name (3aS,4R,9R,10aS)-2,6-Diamino-4-(((aminocarbonyl)oxy)methyl)-3a,4,8,9-tetrahydro-1H,10H-pyrrolo(1,2-c)purine-9,10,10-triol 9-(Hydrogen Sulfate)
- Other names Gonyautoxin 2, GTX-2, GTX-II

Identifiers
CAS Number	II: 60508-89-6
3D model (JSmol)	II: Interactive image
ChEBI	II: CHEBI:80769
ChemSpider	II: 9767779
DrugBank	II: DB19186
EC Number	II: 633-143-8
KEGG	II: C16856
PubChem CID	II: 101650338; 11593018
UNII	II: YU77Z3NY6Z
- InChI: InChI=1S/C10H17N7O8S/c11-6-15-5-3(2-24-8(13)18)14-7(12)17-1-4(25-26(21,22)23)10(19,20)9(5,17)16-6/h3-5,19-20H,1-2H2,(H2,12,14)(H2,13,18)(H3,11,15,16)(H,21,22,23)/t3-,4+,5-,9-/m0/s1 Key: ARSXTTJGWGCRRR-XXKOCQOQSA-N
- SMILES: II: C1[C@H](C([C@@]23N1C(=N[C@H]([C@@H]2N=C(N3)N)COC(=O)N)N)(O)O)OS(=O)(=O)O

Properties
Chemical formula	C_{10}H_{17}N_{7}O_{8}S
Molar mass	395.35 g/mol
- Except where otherwise noted, data are given for materials in their standard state (at 25 °C [77 °F], 100 kPa). verify (what is ?) Infobox references

Gonyautoxins (GTX) are a few similar toxic molecules that are naturally produced by algae. They are part of the group of saxitoxins, a large group of neurotoxins along with a molecule that is also referred to as saxitoxin (STX), neosaxitoxin (NSTX) and decarbamoylsaxitoxin (dcSTX). Currently eight molecules are assigned to the group of gonyautoxins, known as gonyautoxin 1 (GTX-1) to gonyautoxin 8 (GTX-8). Ingestion of gonyautoxins through consumption of mollusks contaminated by toxic algae can cause a human illness called paralytic shellfish poisoning (PSP).

== Natural sources ==
Gonyautoxins are naturally produced by several marine dinoflagellates species (Alexandrium sp., Gonyaulax sp., Protogonyaulax sp.). The paralytic shellfish poisoning caused by these toxins is connected with dinoflagellate blooms known as “red tides”, even though the coloration of the water isn't a necessity. The threshold concentration of the organisms that are capable to produce the toxins is lower than the lowest visually detectable concentration. Subsequently, the toxins are taken up by shellfish and undergo bioaccumulation.

== Structure ==
As part of the group of saxitoxins, the gonyautoxins have their structure based on the 2,6-diamino-4-methyl-pyrrolo[1,2-c]-purin-10-ol skeleton (also known as the Saxitoxin-gonyautoxin skeleton). The different molecules only differ from each other by their substituents, some of them only by a mere stereoisomerism such as GTX-2 and GTX-3. Gonyautoxins are detectable by means of High Performance Liquid Chromatography (HPLC), which has been tested on mice., In 2009 a monoclonal antibody is developed to detect gonyautoxin 2 or 3 in aquatic products. The detection limit is measured to be lower than 0.74 micrograms per milliliter.

== Synthesis ==
While the gonyautoxins are naturally available, a synthesis procedure of some of them is known as well. Gonyautoxin 2 can for example be synthesized from L-serine methyl ester, via gonyautoxin 3. In this process firstly the L-serine methyl ester is treated with aldehyde, so that it can react to close the ring structure. The formed allyl is deprotected by the addition of [[SO_{3}CH_{2}CCl_{3}]]. Subsequently, a RH-catalyzed amination reaction with guanidine is followed, forming the tricyclic frame of GTX-3. The relatively unstable intermediates of several reactions in this process are modified by using three protecting groups. Removing these groups gives 11β-hydrosaxitoxin as a product, which will then be sulfated on the C 11-alcohol. GTX-2 is formed by incubating the product in an aqueous solution at pH 8, in order to make the epimerization at C11 still occur.

== Poisoning and illness ==
=== Toxicology ===
Like every saxitoxin, the gonyautoxins are neurotoxins and cause a disease known as paralytic shellfish poisoning (PSP). For humans a dose of 1–4 mg of these toxins is already lethal. Shellfish can contain more than 10 micrograms of gonyautoxin per 100 gram weight, inducing that the consumption of a few mussels can already be fatal for human. Each year approximately 2000 cases of PSP are reported, of which about 15% end deadly.

=== Mechanism of action ===
As neurotoxins, the gonyautoxins influence the nervous system. They can bind with high affinity at the site 1 of the α-subunit of the voltage dependent sodium channels in the postsynaptic membrane. These channels are responsible for initiating the action potentials, after the synapse. The binding of PSP toxins prevents the generation and propagation of these potentials and hence blocks the synaptic function.

=== Symptoms ===
The symptoms are the typical symptoms of a shellfish toxication. It starts with prickling in the face, which will later spread out over the body. This will be followed by numbness and headaches. In extreme cases, the possibility of vertigos exists as well. Over time the pulse increases and muscle pain occurs. Furthermore, blindness and vision disorders are also possible symptoms. Death is most likely to occur within the first twelve hours, caused by paralysis of the respiratory tract. Most patients who manage to keep up for this time, will survive the poisoning.

=== Detoxification ===
Biotransformation in the human body occurs as a first phase detoxification by oxidizing the gonyautoxin molecule. The formed products are other oxidized forms of gonyautoxins. In the second phase detoxification step a glucuronidation takes place which produces glucuronic-GTX, which has an increased hydrophilicity in comparison to the GTX and can hence be excreted more easily.

=== Treatment ===
Since no antitoxin has been found yet, the treatment is in first line symptomatic for a paralytic shellfish poisoning. Aside a possible artificial respiration, the treatment with charcoal is an option as well because shellfish toxins are likely to be absorbed by this substance. Potentially the strongly discussed treatment with neostigmine, ephedrine, or DL-amphetamine can be helpful as well.

== Other uses ==
Gonyautoxins can be used as treatment against acute or chronic anal fissures. The toxins help the muscle to relax and hence kill the pain. In a study, the bleedings of the poisoned patients stopped within 48 hours. This is thanks to a temporary paralysis at the injection-area, which appears to last for over one week.

== See also ==
- Paralytic shellfish poisoning
- Action potential
- Harmful algal bloom
- Saxitoxin
