= Paraferrimonas =

Scientific classification
- Domain: Bacteria
- Kingdom: Pseudomonadati
- Phylum: Pseudomonadota
- Class: Gammaproteobacteria
- Order: Alteromonadales
- Family: Ferrimonadaceae
- Genus: Paraferrimonas; Khan and Harayama 2007

Type species
- Paraferrimonas sedimenticola

Species
- Paraferrimonas haliotis Paraferrimonas sedimenticola

Synonyms
- Aeribaculum

Genus of bacteria

Paraferrimonas is an iron-reducing genus of bacteria from the family of Ferrimonadaceae.
