= Canadian Reference Materials =

Canadian Reference Materials (CRM) are certified reference materials of high-quality and reliability produced by the National Metrology Institute of Canada – the National Research Council Canada. The NRC Certified Reference Materials program is operated by the Measurement Science and Standards portfolio and provides CRMs for environmental, biotoxin, food, nutritional supplement, and stable isotope analysis. The program was established in 1976 to produce CRMs for inorganic and organic marine environmental analysis and remains internationally recognized producer of CRMs.

== Inorganic CRMs ==
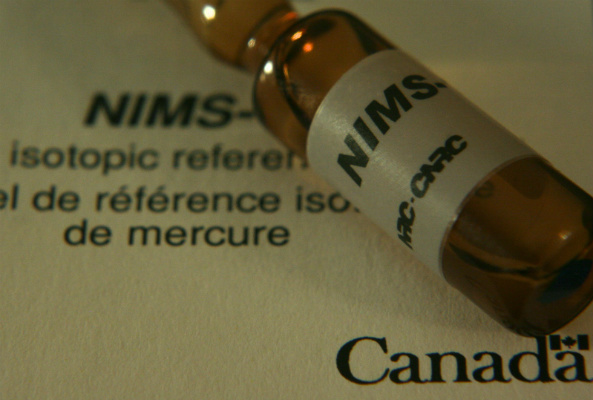
Since 2011, the reference material for the isotopic composition of natural mercury, NIMS-1, is basis for the standard atomic weight of mercury

NRC produces certified reference materials of biological tissues, isotopic standards, natural waters, sediments, supplements, and natural health products. With the exception of the ORMS, the river water CRM with elevated mercury, all materials contain natural levels of analytes in their native matrix.

- Biological tissues
  - DOLT, dogfish liver for trace metals
  - DORM, fish protein for trace metals
  - LUTS, non-defatted lobster hepatopancreas for trace metals
  - TORT, lobster hepatopancreas for trace metals
- Isotopic materials
  - NIMS, natural inorganic mercury standard
  - EMMS, isotopic methylmercury standard
- Natural waters
  - CASS, near-shore seawater for trace metals
  - MOOS, seawater for nutrients
  - NASS, seawater for trace metals
  - ORMS, river water for mercury
  - SLEW, estuarine water for trace metals
  - SLRS, river water for trace metals
- Sediments
  - HISS and MESS, marine sediment for trace metals and major constituents
  - PACS and SOPH, marine sediment for trace metals and major constituents
- Supplements and natural health products
  - CACB, calcium carbonate for lead and cadmium
  - FEBS, otolith for trace metals
  - SELM, selenium-enriched yeast for selenium

== Organic CRMs ==
In 1977, Edmonds et al. reported the identification, isolation, and synthesis of major arsenic-containing substance in sea organisms, the arsenobetaine. In 1999, NRC certified arsenobetaine in the dogfish muscle material DORM-2, which became the first matrix reference material certified for arsenobetaine. Before DORM-2, DORM-1 (issued in 1986) served as the reference material for which the concentration of arsenobetaine was widely reported in scientific literature. Besides arsenobetaine, NRC currently offers matrix reference materials certified for methylmercury (TORT-3), dibutyltin, and tributyltin (PACS-3).

- Biological tissues and sediments
  - CARP, fish for dioxins, furans, and PCBs
  - DOLT, dogfish liver for methylmercury
  - DORM, fish protein for methylmercury
  - TORT, lobster hepatopancreas for methylmercury and arsenobetaine
  - PACS and SOPH, marine sediment for dibutyltin and tributyltin
  - SELM, selenium-enriched yeast for methionine and selenomethionine

== Biotoxin CRMs ==
NRC's domoic acid standard was the first biotoxin reference material in the world

In 1987 Canada witnessed a crisis in the seafood industry. Shellfish toxins present in PEI mussels caused amnesic shellfish poisoning taking several lives. In response, shellfish toxin research was initiated at NRC Canada. Today, NRC remains the premier producer of biotoxin CRMs in the world and is recognized for its expertise.

- Amnesic shellfish poisoning toxins
  - ASP-Mus-d, mussel tissue for domoic acid and its isomers
  - DA-f, domoic acid standard
- Diarrhetic shellfish poisoning and other lipophilic toxins
  - AZA, azaspiracid standards
  - DSP-Mus, mussel tissue for okadaic acid
  - OA, okadaic acid standard
  - DTX, dinophysistoxin standards
  - GYM, gymnodimine standards
  - YTX and hYTX, yessotoxin standards
  - PTX, pectenotoxin-2 standard
  - SPX, 13-desmethyl spirolide C standard
- Microcystins
  - dmMCLR and MCLR, microcystin-LR standards
  - MCRR, microcystin-RR standard
  - NODR, nodularin-R standard
- Paralytic shellfish poisoning toxins
  - C1&2, N-sulfocarbamoyl-gonyautoxin standard
  - dcGTX and GTX, decarbamoyl-gonyautoxin and gonyautoxin standards
  - dcNEO and NEO, decarbamoyl-neosaxitoxin and neosaxitoxin standards
  - dcSTX and STX, decarbamoyl-saxitoxin and saxitoxin standards
- Cyanobacterial toxins
  - ATX, anatoxin-a standard
  - CYN, cylindrospermopsin standard

== See also ==
- Certified reference materials
