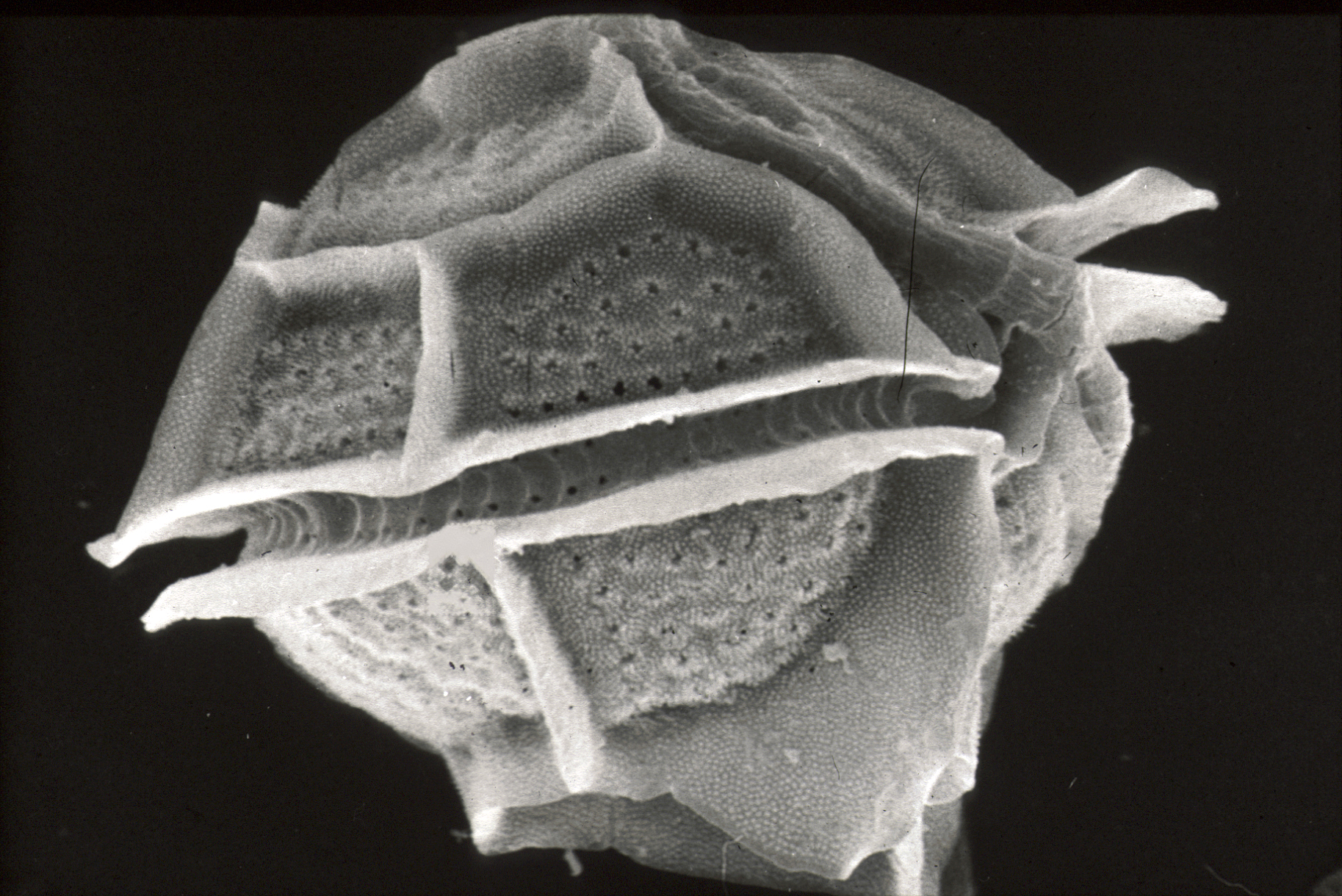
- Pyrodinium bahamense imaged with an electron microscope

Scientific classification
- Domain: Eukaryota
- Clade: Sar
- Clade: Alveolata
- Division: Dinoflagellata
- Class: Dinophyceae
- Order: Gonyaulacales
- Family: Gonyaulacaceae
- Genus: Pyrodinium
- Species: P. bahamense

Binomial name
- Pyrodinium bahamense Plate

= Pyrodinium =

Species of protist

Pyrodinium is a genus of dinoflagellates. It was first discovered in 1906 in the waters around New Providence Island in the Bahamas. Pyrodinium is a monospecific species with two varieties, Pyrodinium bahamense var. compressum and Pyrodinium bahamanse var. bahamense. Pyrodinium is well known for producing paralytic shellfish toxins (PSTs), e.g. saxitoxin, and the bioluminescence that lights up the bioluminescent bays in the Bahamas, Jamaica and Puerto Rico.

== Habitat and ecology ==
Pyrodinium bahamense, considered the sister taxon to Alexandrium, is a tropical photosynthetic euryhaline species of dinoflagellates found mainly in the Atlantic Ocean. It is found in marine waters that have more than 20 psu of salinity and are warmer than 22 °C (72 °F). The optimal salinity is considered to be around 35 psu and the optimum temperature is 28 °C (82 °F). An association between Pyrodinium bahamense occurrence and mangrove forests has been suggested, although, the presence of mangrove forest is not necessarily a predictor for presence of P. bahamense var. bahamense, as it is absent in western and southern Florida Bay. However, regions where large cell densities of Pyrodinium are found are usually shallow and have varied salinities and long water residence times.

P. bahamense has only been studied closely since the 1990s, since it was not cultured in labs before then. Several labs can now grow Pyrodinium in several common seawater based culture media such as ES-DK and f/2, but cell densities typically remain less than 6,000 cells mL^{−1} in culture and are lower than those normally obtained for Alexandrium. The difficulty of culturing P. bahamense is explained by its specific nutrition needs. Initially cultures were only successful with the addition of soil extract, but while soil extract does increase cell densities, it is not necessary for growth. The highest cell density in culture, 6,000 cells mL^{−1}, was obtained by supplementing cultures with selenium, which is present in soil. The influence of soil-derived selenium on growth suggests that Pyrodinium requires terrestrial nutrients in order to reach bloom-level cell densities.

Pyrodinium is able to grow with nitrate and urea as nitrogen sources, but has low tolerance to ammonia. Pyrodinium cannot grow with alanine, arginine, or histidine as nitrogen sources, indicating limited ability to assimilate organic nitrogen. Maximum growth rates and chlorophyll levels are observed when nitrogen levels are greater than 100 μM. Toxin production remains constant when nitrate is between 60 and 500 μM. Since toxin production remains constant even at nitrogen levels limiting to growth, toxin production must play an important role within Pyrodinium cells. However, the toxin profile (i.e. which PSTs are produced) changes under varying growth conditions, so nutrient conditions may affect toxicity.

Pyrodinium is able to utilize organic and inorganic phosphorus.

=== Harmful algal blooms ===
Pyrodinium have caused more human illnesses and fatalities than any other dinoflagellate that produces paralytic shellfish toxin or PST. It was initially widely believed that the compressum variety was toxic and found in the Pacific while the bahamense variety was nontoxic and found in the Atlantic, but a 1972 toxic algal bloom of Pyrodinium bahamense in Papua New Guinea showed this was not the case. It is now known that P. bahamense is a major cause of seafood toxicity and paralytic shellfish poisoning, especially in Southeast Asia, and causes toxicity along Central American coasts. In addition, there are at least two places in the world where both varieties of Pyrodinium bahamense are found together: the Persian Gulf and coast of Mexico.

The ecophysiology of Pyrodinium blooms is not well understood. Unlike Alexandrium blooms, where resting cysts are often the most important seed-source for blooms, it is unclear whether resting cysts or background populations of vegetative cells are more important in initiating Pyrodinium blooms. However, cysts are abundant in the sediments of lagoons and bays where blooms form and the resuspension of sediment and cysts may indeed be important to initiating blooms. Blooms also tend to occur after periods of high rain, suggesting that a terrestrial-sourced nutrient is usually limiting. On a global scale, blooms seem to be linked to the El Nino Southern Oscillation (ENSO), probably because of changes in precipitation and delivery of terrestrial nutrients.

=== Bioluminescence ===
P. bahamense displays bioluminescence when agitated, glowing blue. Pyrodinium bahamense is the phytoplankton primarily responsible for the bioluminescence in the bioluminescent bays, or "bio bays," of Puerto Rico and the Bahamas. The bright cobalt blue light produced by these dinoflagellates when they are mechanically disturbed creates a magical effect that draws many tourists to the bays. Most of the bays are in reserves, and no swimming is allowed, but guests are able to kayak in the bays at night with local guides to observe the bioluminescence.

== Morphology and anatomy ==
Pyrodinium bahamense cells are shaped like ellipsoids and are covered with thick, protective thecal plates that have many small, evenly distributed knobs and trichocyst pores. They also have an ornamental apical projection or node, as well as sulcal fins on either sides of the sulcus.

The Pyrodinium resting cyst is spherical with many thin, tubular processes of variable length.

== Life cycle ==
Sexual reproduction and formation of resting cysts typically occurs during bloom decline. In its dormant stages, P. bahamense develop spherical, double-layered cysts for protection. These cysts, called Polysphaeridium zoharyi in the paleontological classification system, are similar in both P. bahamense varieties and have tubular processes protruding from the outer layer.
