= Saxitoxin =

Paralytic shellfish toxin

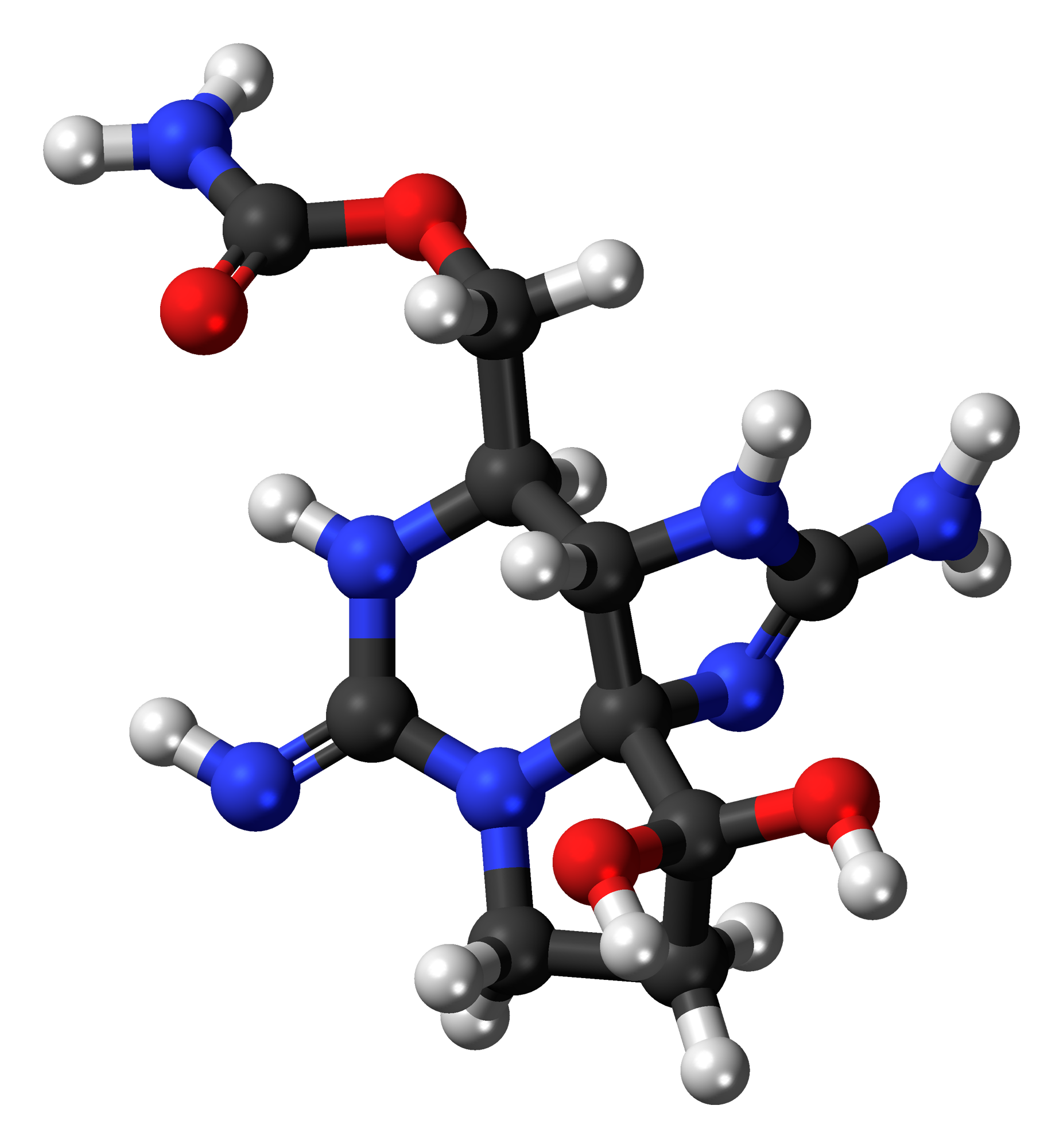

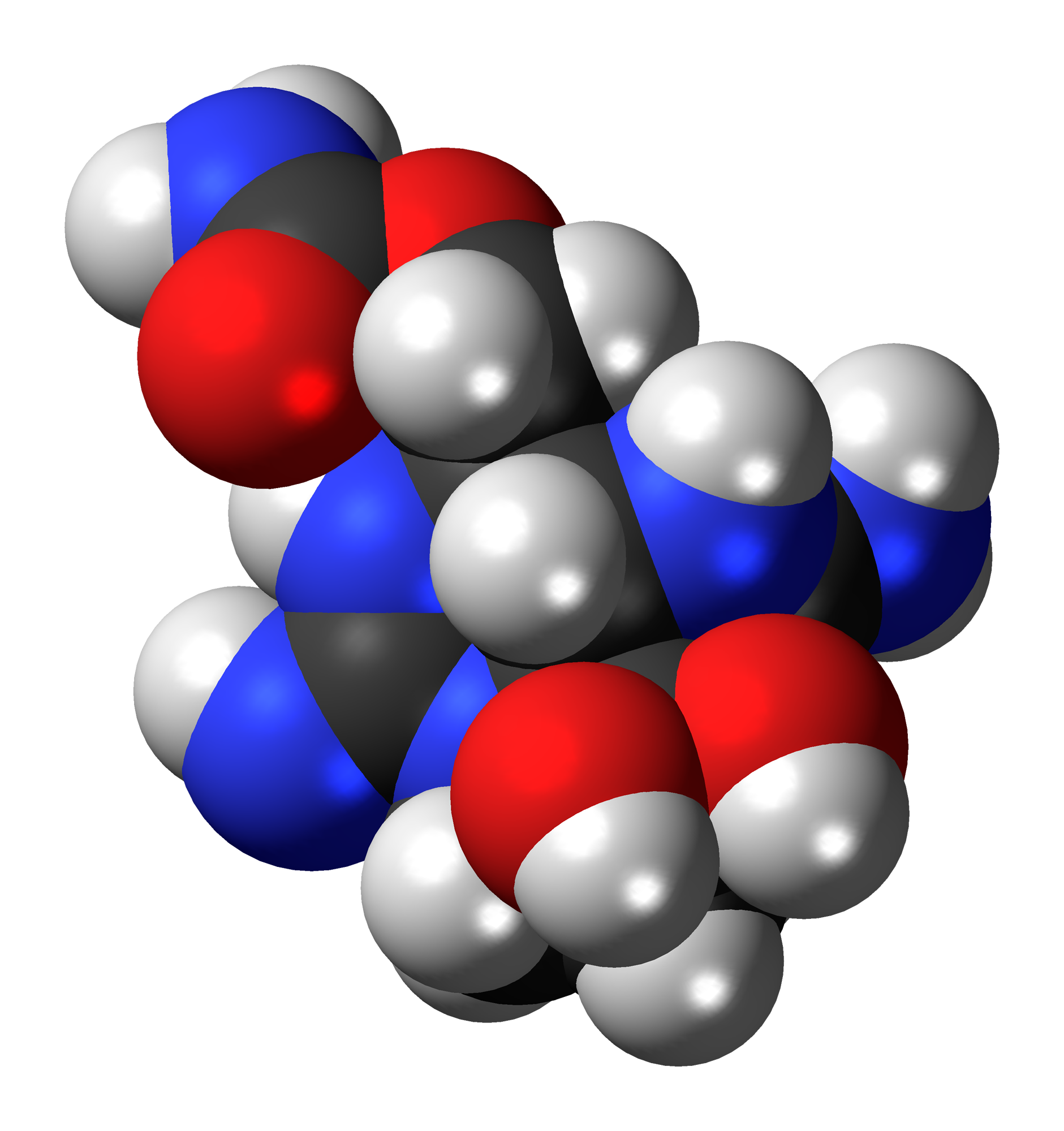

Names
- IUPAC name [(3aS,4R,10aS)-10,10-dihydroxy-2,6-diiminooctahydro-1H,8H-pyrrolo[1,2-c]purin-4-yl]methyl carbamate

Identifiers
CAS Number	35523-89-8
3D model (JSmol)	Interactive image
ChEBI	CHEBI:34970
ChEMBL	ChEMBL501134
ChemSpider	34106
ECHA InfoCard	100.160.395
IUPHAR/BPS	2625
KEGG	C13757
PubChem CID	37165
UNII	Q0638E899B
CompTox Dashboard (EPA)	DTXSID3074313
- InChI: InChI=1S/C10H17N7O4/c11-6-15-5-4(3-21-8(13)18)14-7(12)17-2-1-9(19,20)10(5,17)16-6/h4-5,19-20H,1-3H2,(H2,12,14)(H2,13,18)(H3,11,15,16)/t4-,5-,10-/m0/s1 Key: RPQXVSUAYFXFJA-HGRQIUPRSA-N; InChI=1/C10H17N7O4/c11-6-15-5-4(3-21-8(13)18)14-7(12)17-2-1-9(19,20)10(5,17)16-6/h4-5,19-20H,1-3H2,(H2,12,14)(H2,13,18)(H3,11,15,16)/t4-,5-,10-/m0/s1 Key: RPQXVSUAYFXFJA-HGRQIUPRBO
- SMILES: O=C(OC[C@@H]2/N=C(/N)N3[C@]1(/N=C(\N[C@H]12)N)C(O)(O)CC3)N

Properties
Chemical formula	C_{10}H_{17}N_{7}O_{4}
Molar mass	299.291 g·mol^{−1}
- Except where otherwise noted, data are given for materials in their standard state (at 25 °C [77 °F], 100 kPa). verify (what is ?) Infobox references

Saxitoxin (STX) is a potent neurotoxin and the best-known paralytic shellfish toxin. Ingestion of saxitoxin by humans, usually by consumption of shellfish contaminated by toxic algal blooms, is responsible for the illness known as paralytic shellfish poisoning (PSP).

The term saxitoxin originates from the genus name of the butter clam (Saxidomus) from which it was first isolated. But the term saxitoxin can also refer to the entire suite of more than 50 structurally related neurotoxins (known collectively as "saxitoxins") produced by protists, algae and cyanobacteria which includes saxitoxin itself (STX), neosaxitoxin (NSTX), gonyautoxins (GTX) and decarbamoylsaxitoxin (dcSTX).

Saxitoxin has a large environmental and economic impact, as its presence in bivalve shellfish such as mussels, clams, oysters and scallops frequently leads to bans on commercial and recreational shellfish harvesting in many temperate coastal waters around the world including the Northeastern and Western United States, Western Europe, East Asia, Australia, New Zealand, and South Africa. In the United States, paralytic shellfish poisoning has occurred in California, Oregon, Washington, Alaska, and New England.

== Source in nature ==
Saxitoxin is a neurotoxin naturally produced by certain species of marine dinoflagellates (Alexandrium sp., Gymnodinium sp., Pyrodinium sp.) and freshwater cyanobacteria (Dolichospermum cicinale sp., some Aphanizomenon spp., Cylindrospermopsis sp., Lyngbya sp., Planktothrix sp.) Saxitoxin accumulates in "planktivorous invertebrates, including mollusks (bivalves and gastropods), crustaceans, and echinoderms".

Saxitoxin has also been found in at least twelve marine puffer fish species in Asia and one freshwater fish (tilapia) in Brazil. The ultimate source of STX is often still uncertain. The dinoflagellate Pyrodinium bahamense is the source of STX found in Florida. Recent research shows the detection of STX in the skin, muscle, viscera, and gonads of "Indian River Lagoon" southern puffer fish, with the highest concentration (22,104 μg STX eq/100 g tissue) measured in the ovaries. Even after a year of captivity, Landsberg et al. found the skin mucus remained highly toxic. The concentrations in puffer fish from the United States are similar to those found in the Philippines, Thailand, Japan, and South American countries. Puffer fish also accumulate a structurally distinct toxin, tetrodotoxin.

== Structure and synthesis ==
Saxitoxin dihydrochloride is an amorphous hygroscopic solid, but X-ray crystallography of crystalline derivatives enabled the structure of saxitoxin to be determined. Oxidation of saxitoxin generates a highly fluorescent purine derivative which has been utilized to detect its presence.

Several total syntheses of saxitoxin have been accomplished.

== Mechanism of action ==
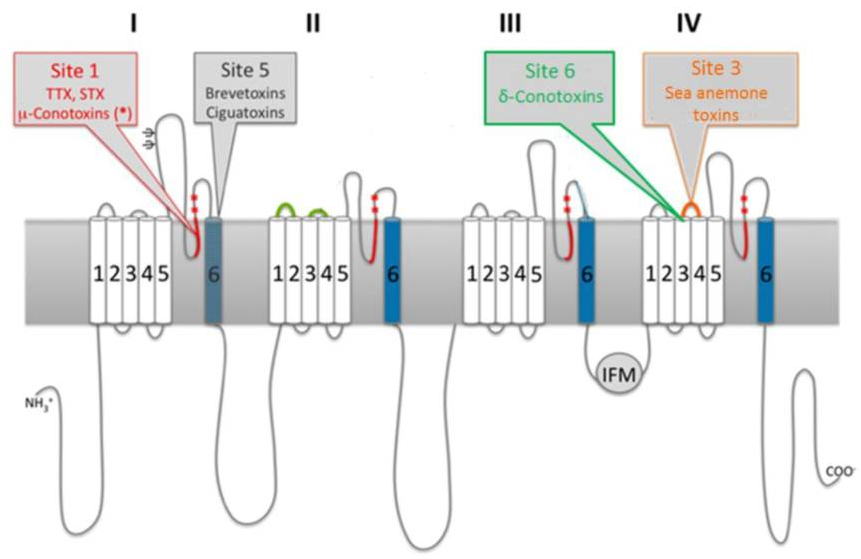
A diagram of the membrane topology of a voltage gated sodium channel protein. Binding sites for different neurotoxins are indicated by color. Saxitoxin is denoted by red.

Saxitoxin is a neurotoxin that acts as a selective, reversible, voltage-gated sodium channel blocker. One of the most potent known natural toxins, it acts on the voltage-gated sodium channels of neurons, preventing normal cellular function and leading to paralysis.

The voltage-gated sodium channel is essential for normal neuronal functioning. It exists as integral membrane proteins interspersed along the axon of a neuron and possessing four domains that span the cell membrane. Opening of the voltage-gated sodium channel occurs when there is a change in voltage or some ligand binds in the right way. It is of foremost importance for these sodium channels to function properly, as they are essential for the propagation of an action potential. Without this ability, the nerve cell becomes unable to transmit signals and the region of the body that it innervates is cut off from the nervous system. This may lead to paralysis of the affected region, as in the case of saxitoxin.

Saxitoxin binds reversibly to the sodium channel. It binds directly in the pore of the channel protein, occluding the opening, and preventing the flow of sodium ions through the membrane. This leads to the nervous shutdown described above.

== Biosynthesis ==
Although the biosynthesis of saxitoxin seems complex, organisms from two different kingdoms, indeed two different domains, species of marine dinoflagellates and freshwater cyanobacteria are capable of producing these toxins. While the prevailing theory of production in dinoflagellates was through symbiotic mutualism with cyanobacteria, evidence has emerged suggesting that dinoflagellates themselves also possess the genes required for saxitoxin synthesis.

Saxitoxin biosynthesis is the first non-terpene alkaloid pathway described for bacteria, though the exact mechanism of saxitoxin biosynthesis is still essentially a theoretical model. The precise mechanism of how substrates bind to enzymes is still unknown, and genes involved in the biosynthesis of saxitoxin are either putative or have only recently been identified.

Two biosyntheses have been proposed in the past. Earlier versions differ from a more recent proposal by Kellmann, et al. based on both biosynthetic considerations as well as genetic evidence not available at the time of the first proposal. The more recent model describes a STX gene cluster (Sxt) used to obtain a more favorable reaction. The most recent reaction sequence of Sxt in cyanobacteria is as follows. Refer to the diagram for a detailed biosynthesis and intermediate structures.

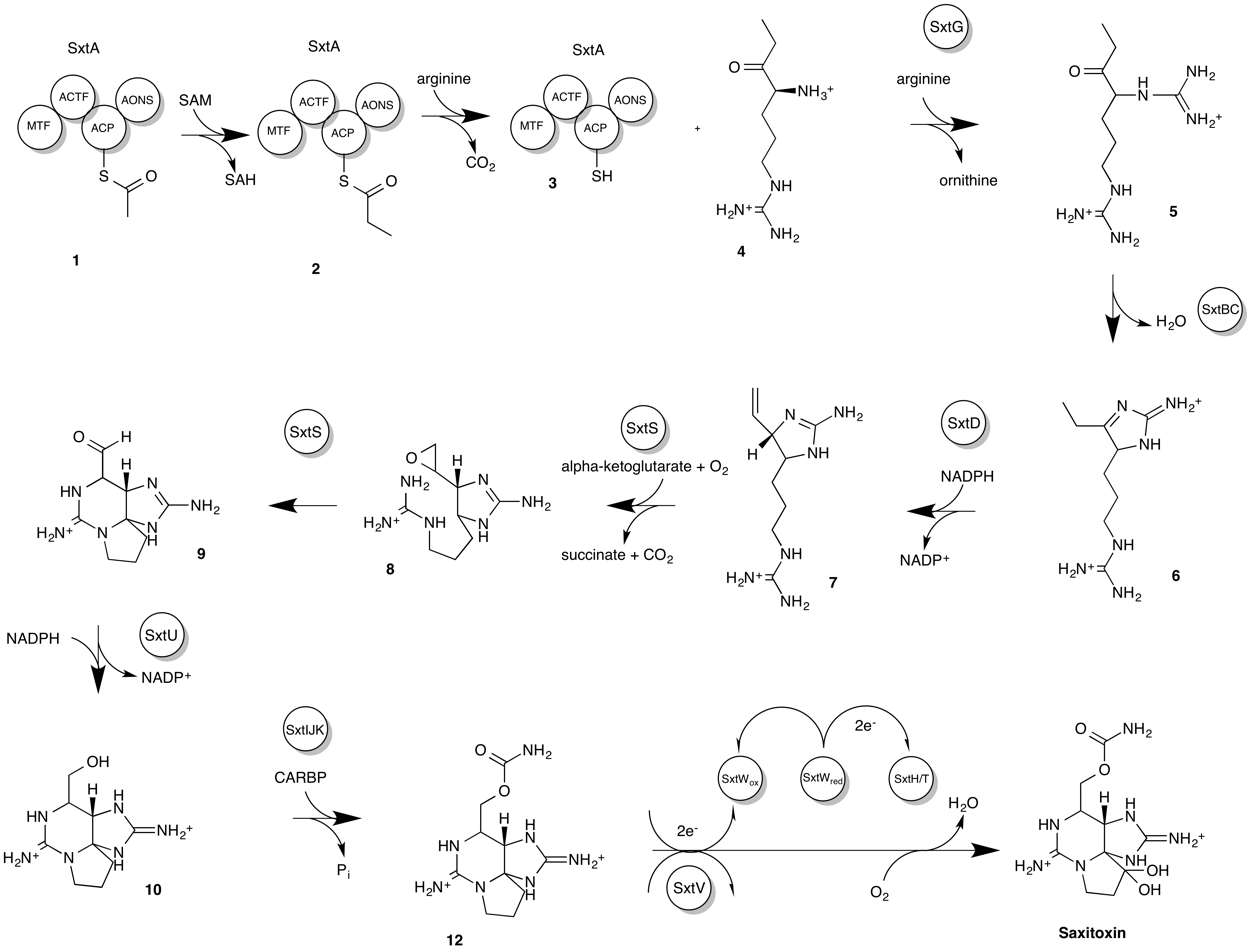
Biosynthesis

1. It begins with the loading of the acyl carrier protein (ACP) with acetate from acetyl-CoA, yielding intermediate 1.
2. This is followed by SxtA-catalyzed methylation of acetyl-ACP, which is then converted to propionyl-ACP, yielding intermediate 2.
3. Later, another SxtA performs a Claisen condensation reaction between propionyl-ACP and arginine producing intermediate 4 and intermediate 3.
4. SxtG transfers an amidino group from an arginine to the α-amino group of intermediate 4 producing intermediate 5.
5. Intermediate 5 then undergoes retroaldol-like condensation by SxtBC, producing intermediate 6.
6. SxtD adds a double bond between C-1 and C-5 of intermediate 6, which gives rise to the 1,2-H shift between C-5 and C-6 in intermediate 7.
7. SxtS performs an epoxidation of the double bond yielding intermediate 8, and then an opening of the epoxide to an aldehyde, forming intermediate 9.
8. SxtU reduces the terminal aldehyde group of the STX intermediate 9, thus forming intermediate 10.
9. SxtIJK catalyzes the transfer of a carbamoyl group to the free hydroxyl group on intermediate 10, forming intermediate 11.
10. SxtH and SxtT, in conjunction with SxtV and the SxtW gene cluster, perform a similar function which is the consecutive hydroxylation of C-12, thus producing saxitoxin and terminating the STX biosynthetic pathway.

== Illness and poisoning ==
=== Toxicology ===
Saxitoxin is highly toxic to guinea pigs, fatal at only 5 μg/kg when injected intramuscularly. The median lethal dose (LD_{50}) for mice is very similar with varying administration routes: i.v. is 3.4 μg/kg, i.p. is 10 μg/kg and p.o. is 263 μg/kg. The oral LD_{50} for humans is 5.7 μg/kg, therefore approximately 0.57 mg of saxitoxin is lethal if ingested and the lethal dose by injection is about one-tenth of that (approximately 0.6 μg/kg). The human inhalation toxicity of aerosolized saxitoxin is estimated to be 5 mg·min/m^{3}. Saxitoxin can enter the body via open wounds and a lethal dose of 50 μg/person by this route has been suggested.

=== Illness in humans ===
The human illness associated with ingestion of harmful levels of saxitoxin is known as paralytic shellfish poisoning, or PSP, and saxitoxin and its derivatives are often referred to as "PSP toxins".

The medical and environmental importance of saxitoxin derives from the consumption of contaminated shellfish and certain finfish which can concentrate the toxin from dinoflagellates or cyanobacteria. The blocking of neuronal sodium channels which occurs in PSP produces a flaccid paralysis that leaves its victim calm and conscious through the progression of symptoms. Death often occurs from respiratory failure. PSP toxins have been implicated in various marine animal mortalities involving trophic transfer of the toxin from its algal source up the food chain to higher predators.

Studies in animals have shown that the lethal effects of saxitoxin can be reversed with 4-aminopyridine, but there are no studies on human subjects. As with any paralytic agent, where the acute concern is respiratory failure, mouth-to-mouth resuscitation or artificial ventilation of any means will keep a poisoned victim alive until antidote is administered or the poison wears off.

== Military interest ==
Saxitoxin, by virtue of its extremely low LD_{50}, readily lends itself to weaponization. In the past, it was considered for military use by the United States and was developed as a chemical weapon by the US military. It is known that saxitoxin was developed for both overt military use as well as for covert purposes by the CIA. Among weapons stockpiles were M1 munitions that contained either saxitoxin, botulinum toxin or a mixture of both. The CIA is known to have issued a small dose of saxitoxin to U-2 spy plane pilot Francis Gary Powers in the form of a small injection hidden within a silver dollar, for use in the event of his capture and detainment.

After the 1969 ban on biological warfare by President Nixon, the US stockpiles of saxitoxin were destroyed, and development of saxitoxin as a military weapon ceased. In 1975, the CIA reported to Congress that it had kept a small amount of saxitoxin and cobra venom against Nixon's orders which was then destroyed or distributed to researchers.

It is listed in schedule 1 of the Chemical Weapons Convention. The United States military isolated saxitoxin and assigned it the chemical weapon designation TZ.

== See also ==
- Action potential – Neuron communication by electric impulses
- Anabaena circinalis – Species of bacterium
- Alexandrium tamarense – Species of single-celled organism
- Canadian Reference Materials
- Ciguatoxin – Group of chemical compounds
- Domoic acid
- Harmful algal bloom – Population explosion of organisms that can kill marine life
- Okadaic acid
- Paralytic shellfish poisoning – Syndrome of shellfish poisoning
- Tetrodotoxin – Neurotoxin
