= Neosaxitoxin =

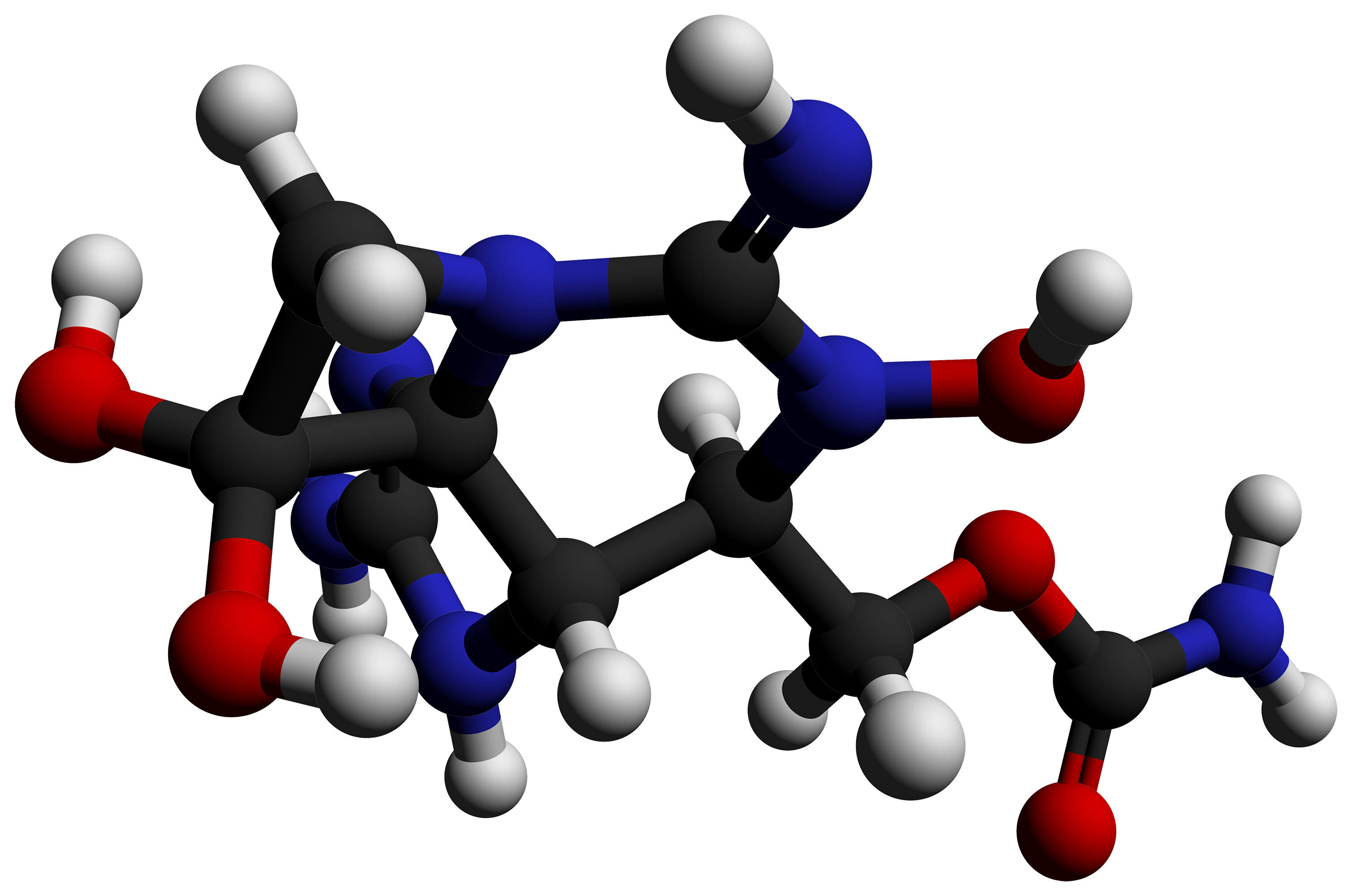

Names
- IUPAC name [(3aS,4R,10aS)-5,10,10-Trihydroxy-2,6-diiminooctahydro-1H,8H-pyrrolo[1,2-c]purin-4-yl]methyl carbamate
- Other names 1H,10H-Pyrrolo(1,2-c)purine-10,10-diol, 2-amino-4-(((aminocarbonyl)oxy)methyl)-3a,4,5,6,8,9-hexahydro-5-hydroxy-6-imino-, (3aS,4R,10aS)-; 1H,10H-Pyrrolo(1,2-c)purine-10,10-diol, 2-amino-4-((aminocarbonyl)oxy)methyl-3a,4,5,6,8,9-hexahydro-5-hydroxy-6-imino-,(3aS,4R,10aS)-; 1H,10H-Pyrrolo(1,2-c)purine-10,10-diol, 2-amino-4-((aminocarbonyl)oxy)methyl-3a,4,5,6,8,9-hexahydro-5-hydroxy-6-imino-,(3aS-(3aalpha,4alpha,10aR*))-

Identifiers
CAS Number	64296-20-4
3D model (JSmol)	Interactive image
ChEBI	CHEBI:167561
ChemSpider	19975931
ECHA InfoCard	100.237.662
KEGG	C17208
PubChem CID	135562690
UNII	6YRL8BWD9H
CompTox Dashboard (EPA)	DTXSID70880098
- InChI: InChI=1S/C10H17N7O5/c11-6-14-5-4(3-22-8(13)18)17(21)7(12)16-2-1-9(19,20)10(5,16)15-6/h4-5,12,19-21H,1-3H2,(H2,13,18)(H3,11,14,15)/t4-,5-,10-/m0/s1 Key: PPEKGEBBBBNZKS-HGRQIUPRSA-N; InChI=1/C10H17N7O5/c11-6-14-5-4(3-22-8(13)18)17(21)7(12)16-2-1-9(19,20)10(5,16)15-6/h4-5,12,19-21H,1-3H2,(H2,13,18)(H3,11,14,15)/t4-,5-,10-/m0/s1 Key: PPEKGEBBBBNZKS-HGRQIUPRBS
- SMILES: C1CN2C(=N)N([C@H]([C@H]3[C@]2(C1(O)O)NC(=N)N3)COC(=O)N)O

Properties
Chemical formula	C_{10}H_{17}N_{7}O_{5}
Molar mass	315.286

Hazards
- GHS labelling
Pictograms	(GHS06: Toxic)
Signal word	Danger
Hazard statements	H300
Precautionary statements	P264, P270, P301+P310, P321, P330, P405, P501
- Except where otherwise noted, data are given for materials in their standard state (at 25 °C [77 °F], 100 kPa). Infobox references

Neosaxitoxin (NSTX) is included, as other saxitoxin-analogs, in a broad group of natural neurotoxic alkaloids, commonly known as the paralytic shellfish toxins (PSTs). The parent compound of PSTs, saxitoxin (STX), is a tricyclic perhydropurine alkaloid, which can be substituted at various positions, leading to more than 30 naturally occurring STX analogues. All of them are related imidazoline guanidinium derivatives.

== Sources ==
NSTX, and other PSTs, are produced by several species of marine dinoflagellates (eukaryotes) and freshwater cyanobacteria, blue-green algae (prokaryotes), which can form extensive blooms around the world. Under special conditions, during harmful algal blooms (HAB) or red tide, all these toxins may build up in filter-feeding shellfish, such as mussels, clams and oysters, and can produce an outbreak of Paralytic Shellfish Poisoning (PSP).

Saxitoxin analogues associated to PSP can be divided into three categories:

- Carbamate compounds, including saxitoxin, neosaxitoxin and gonyautoxins 1–4.
- N-sulfocarbamoyl compounds, including C and B toxins.
- Decarbamoyl compounds with respect to the presence or absence of 1-N-hydroxyl, 11-hydroxysulfate, and 21-N-sulfocarbamoyl substitutions as well as epimerization at the C-11 position.

== Structure and properties ==
NSTX is quite similar to saxitoxin, like all the neurotoxins associated to PSP, the only difference is that NSTX shows one hydroxyl group bonded to nitrogen "1", where saxitoxyn contains one hydrogen.

This purine is highly hydrophilic and thermostable, it is not destroyed by cooking. Moreover, is very stable in usual storage, specially in acidic condition.

== Mechanism of action ==
NSTX blocks the extracellular portion, the outer vestibule, of some voltage gated sodium channels in a very powerful and reversible manner, without affection of other ion channels.

"Voltage-gated", "voltage-sensitive" and "voltage-dependent" sodium channels - also known as "VGSCs" or "NaV" ("Na_{v}") channels" - are crucial elements of normal physiology in a variety of animals, including flies, leeches, squid and jellyfish, as well as mammalian and non-mammalian vertebrates. This large integral membrane protein plays an essential role in the initiation and propagation of action potentials in neurons, myocytes and other excitable cells.

NaV channels form the basis of electrical excitability in animal cells. Like many other neuronal channels and receptors, NaV channels pre-date neurons; having evolved from Ca^{2+} channels - likely permeable to Na^{+} and Ca^{2+} - present in the common ancestor of choanoflagellates and animals. Invertebrates possess two NaV channels - Na_{v}1 and Na_{v}2 - while vertebrates only possess Na_{v}1 family channels.

Sodium-channel proteins in the mammalian brain comprise one alpha subunit and one or more auxiliary beta subunits. Nine types of alpha subunits, Na_{v}1.1 to Na_{v}1.9, have been described, and a tenth isoform, Na_{x}, is suspected to perform some NaV-channel-like activity. Between five and six neurotoxin receptor sites have been recognised between the seven receptor sites in vertebrate sodium channel receptor alpha subunits:

- Site 1 binds the sodium channel blockers tetrodotoxin and saxitoxin.
- Site 2 binds lipid-soluble sodium channel activators such as veratridine.
- Site 3 binds alpha-scorpion and sea anemone toxins, which slow sodium channel inactivation.
- Site 4 binds beta-scorpion toxins, which affect sodium channel activation.
- Site 5 binds the polyether ladder brevetoxins and ciguatoxin.
- Site 6 binds delta-conotoxin.
- Local anesthetic receptor site binds local anesthetics, antiarrhythmic drugs and antiepileptic drugs

NSTX and other site 1 blockers have high affinity (very low dissociation constant) and high specificity for NaV channels. The action of NSTX produces minimal effect on cardiac NaV channels, exhibiting around 20–60 fold less affinity than NaV channels in skeletal muscle and the brain of rats. Most data emphasize the role of "STX resistant" NaV channel 1.5 in human heart muscles.

Toxins such as neosaxitoxin and tetrodotoxin have a lower affinity for most cardiac Na_{v} channels than nerve tissue Na_{v} channels. Moreover, the affinity of NSTX for nerve Na_{v} channels exhibits a potency roughly a million-fold that of lidocaine.

== Effects on humans ==
This mechanism of action can produce two well known kinds of effects in humans:

=== Toxic effect, associated to plasmatic levels of NSTX ===
It can be approximately described using one of the classical model of neurotoxic disease, known from ancient times as red tide, the most harmful algal bloom (HAB). This well known clinical model is the "paralytic shellfish poisoning".

Of course, there are great differences between different algal blooms, because of the mix of species included in each HAB, usually related to environmental conditions; because of the levels and quality of PSTs produced in each HAB, that may be modulated by concurrent microorganism; and, last but not least, because of the specific properties of each kind of PST, for example:

- Brevetoxins are lipid-soluble (hydrophobic) polyether marine toxins; their predominant effect is excitatory (blocked by tetrodotoxin), mediated by the enhancement of cellular Na^{+} influx; and bind to site 5 on Nav (like ciguatoxin).
- Tetrodotoxin (TTX) toxicity is associated with marked and surprising cardiovascular effects (i.e.: hypotension and bradycardia). Those effects are unexpected because of notorious TTX-resistance observed in vertebrate cardiac Nav channel. Moreover, this characteristic of the mammalian cardiac Nav channel is attributed to the cardiac predominance of the TTX-resistant Nav channel isoform (Na_{v}1.5). On the contrary, as presumed on physiologic basis, NSTX produces just mild and transient cardiovascular abnormalities during experimental intoxication (there are no data on pure NSTX clinical toxicity).
- STX has two positive charges, in contrast to TTX's single charge and GTX2/3, a naturally occurring STX congener with a net +1 charge. In view of their rather different structures, it is not surprising that STX and TTX bind in a different fashion to VGSCs. In fact, when Phe 385 near the selectivity filter of Na_{v}1.2 is mutated to Cys, the channel's affinity for TTX is reduced 3,000-fold, whereas that for STX is reduced (only) 340-fold.
- There are very limited data on the relative potency of different PSTs, and developing alternative methods to animal bioassays for marine-toxin detection is an urgent need.

In spite of its heterogeneous and poorly understood epidemiology, the clinical picture of PSP could be useful to anticipate clinical effects of systemic NSTX.

- In the most frequent and benign situation, the patient suffers just mild, short-lived paresthesias of the mouth or extremities.
- In moderate cases perioral tingling progressing to numbness spreading to face and neck can be observed.
- In severe cases, patient can suffer apnea secondary to motor block, requiring mechanical ventilation.

Usually, the victims of mild and severe acute intoxications eliminate the toxin in urine during the first 24 hours after ingestion, and improve to full recovery in the first day of intrahospital care (when vital support is provided in a timely manner).

When outbreaks of PSP occur in remote locations, where medical assistance is limited, reported lethality is under 10% in adults, but can reach 50% in children younger than six years old. This difference could be secondary to dissimilar doses and composition of involved mixes of PSTs; delay in medical support; or some kind of susceptibility of children. More recent information suggest that lethality could be around 1% of symptomatic patients, including cases where air transportation was required from remote locations of Alaska.

Electrophysiologic observations demonstrated sub clinical abnormalities lasting for some days or weeks after clinical recovery .

Some evidence suggest the presence of metabolic pathways for the sequential oxidation and glucuronidation of PST in vitro, both being the initial detoxication reactions for the excretion of these toxins in humans.

Forensic analysis of fatalities after severe cases, conclude that PSP toxins are metabolically transformed by humans and that they are removed from the body by excretion in the urine and feces like any other xenobiotic compound.

Considering the heterogeneous nature of toxins mixes contained in contaminated bivalve molluscs, the safe limit of toxin content in shellfish adequate for human ingestion is expressed in "saxitoxin equivalents". According to the Food and Agriculture Organization of the United Nations (FAO) and European Parliament, this limit is 80 microgram of saxitoxin equivalent per 100 gram of mussel meat (each mussel weights around 23 g). The U.S. Food and Drug Administration extends the same definition to "fish" quality, but the term "fish" refers to fresh or saltwater fin fish, crustaceans, other forms of aquatic animal life other than birds or mammals, and all mollusks; and incorporate the use of "ppm" as another measure for saxitoxin equivalent concentration in mentioned foods.

Paradoxically, the chronic and/or repeated exposure to marine seafood toxins, which is a much more realistic phenomenon, has not been fully examined. One study in rats exposed to chronic (12 weeks) NSTX administration demonstrated some reduction in water and food intake, and a mild degree of transient cholestasis, probably associated to fasting, without other abnormalities.

=== Anesthetic effect, produced by local infiltration of NSTX ===
This action has been demonstrated in animals and humans.

The medical use of the NSTX anesthetic effect is supported by three reasons:

1. NSTX anesthetic duration:
  - Any current available local anesthetic hardly produces clinical effects 12 hours after a single injection. Then, in cases of severe or prolonged pain, some patients need repeated injections, catheters, pumps and opioids to feel comfortable, with different kinds of side effects, costs and risks.
  - On the other hand, NSTX local infiltration produces long lasting anesthesia, well over all the current available local anesthetics. Some investigations demonstrated anesthetic effect lasting over one week after single injection in rodents, using extended release formulation, without histologic or functional sequelae.
  - Additionally, two human reports demonstrated strong potentiation between NSTX anesthetic effect, bupivacaine and epinephrine.
2. NSTX local safety:
  - All available local anesthetic are associated with local damage in different models. This undesired effect could be enhanced by sustained release formulations.
  - On the contrary, several investigations show local safety of saxitoxin-related neurotoxins, including very sensitive models, and there is no reason to presume otherwise for NSTX.
3. NSTX systemic safety:
  - In spite of advances of ultrasound guided injections, acute systemic local anesthetic toxicity is still an unsolved clinical problem, and can produce devastating consequences, related to the neurologic and cardiovascular effects of all available local anesthetics.
  - Otherwise, clinical experience and animal models shows the relative safety of accidental and experimental NSTX intoxication (when appropriate support therapy is provided in a timely manner).
  - Recent investigation in sheep shows a safe limit, due to motor block, over 1 μg/kg for intravenous injection of NSTX, with full recovery after a brief course of mechanical ventilation.
  - Regarding systemic safety, saxitoxins diffuse through the blood–brain barrier, but, because of Nav channel specificity, acute toxicity is associated to a very low risk of seizures. This establishes an important difference with current local anesthetic toxicity.
  - As could be predicted from its ion channel selectivity, NSTX intoxication clinical picture is almost devoid of arrhythmias, establishing another difference with available local anesthetic's numerous cardiac effects.
  - And last but not least, some degree of improving in therapeutic index of NSTX can be observed when is mixed with bupivacaine and/or epinephrine.

In conclusion, NSTX is a well defined molecule with a long-lasting and sometimes dangerous relationship with human subjects. Recent investigations suggest a clinical application as a new local anesthetic that sounds "too good to be true", but more investigation is required.

== See also ==
- Canadian Reference Materials
