= Ferrimonadaceae =

Scientific classification
- Domain: Bacteria
- Kingdom: Pseudomonadati
- Phylum: Pseudomonadota
- Class: Gammaproteobacteria
- Order: Alteromonadales
- Family: Ferrimonadaceae; Ivanova et al. 2004

Genera
- Ferrimonas; Paraferrimonas

Family of bacteria

Ferrimonadaceae is a family in the order of Alteromonadales.
