= Harmful algal bloom =

Population explosion of organisms that can kill marine life

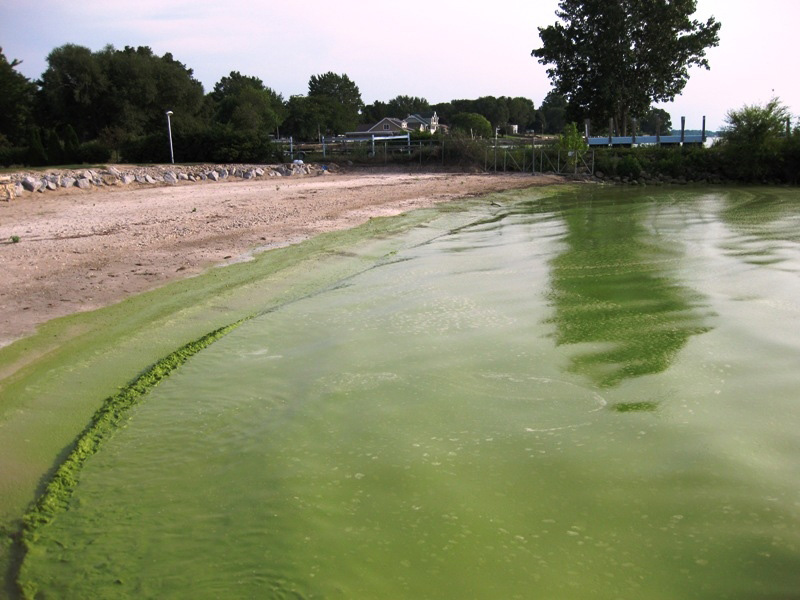
Cyanobacteria (blue-green algae) bloom on Lake Erie, United States, 2009

A harmful algal bloom (HAB), or excessive algae growth, sometimes called a red tide in marine environments, is an algal bloom that causes negative impacts to other organisms by production of natural algae-produced toxins, water deoxygenation, mechanical damage to other organisms, or by other means. HABs are sometimes defined as only those algal blooms that produce toxins, and sometimes as any algal bloom that can result in severely lower oxygen levels in natural waters, killing organisms in marine or fresh waters. Blooms can last from a few days to many months. After the bloom dies, the microbes that decompose the dead algae use up more of the oxygen, generating a "dead zone" which can cause fish die-offs. When these zones cover a large area for an extended period of time, neither fish nor plants are able to survive.

It is sometimes unclear what causes specific HABs as their occurrence in some locations appears to be entirely natural, while in others they appear to be a result of human activities. In certain locations there are links to particular drivers like nutrients, but HABs have also been occurring since before humans started to affect the environment. HABs are induced by eutrophication, which is an overabundance of nutrients in the water. The two most common nutrients are fixed nitrogen (nitrates, ammonia, and urea) and phosphate. The excess nutrients are emitted by agriculture, industrial pollution, excessive fertilizer use in urban/suburban areas, and associated urban runoff. Higher water temperature and low circulation also contribute.

HABs can cause significant harm to animals, the environment and economies. They have been increasing in size and frequency worldwide, a fact that many experts attribute to global climate change. The U.S. National Oceanic and Atmospheric Administration (NOAA) predicts more harmful blooms in the Pacific Ocean. Potential remedies include chemical treatment, additional reservoirs, sensors and monitoring devices, reducing nutrient runoff, research and management as well as monitoring and reporting.

Terrestrial runoff, containing fertilizer, sewage and livestock wastes, transports abundant nutrients to the seawater and stimulates bloom events. Natural causes, such as river floods or upwelling of nutrients from the sea floor, often following massive storms, provide nutrients and trigger bloom events as well. Increasing coastal developments and aquaculture also contribute to the occurrence of coastal HABs. Effects of HABs can worsen locally due to wind-driven Langmuir circulation and their biological effects.

== Description and identification ==
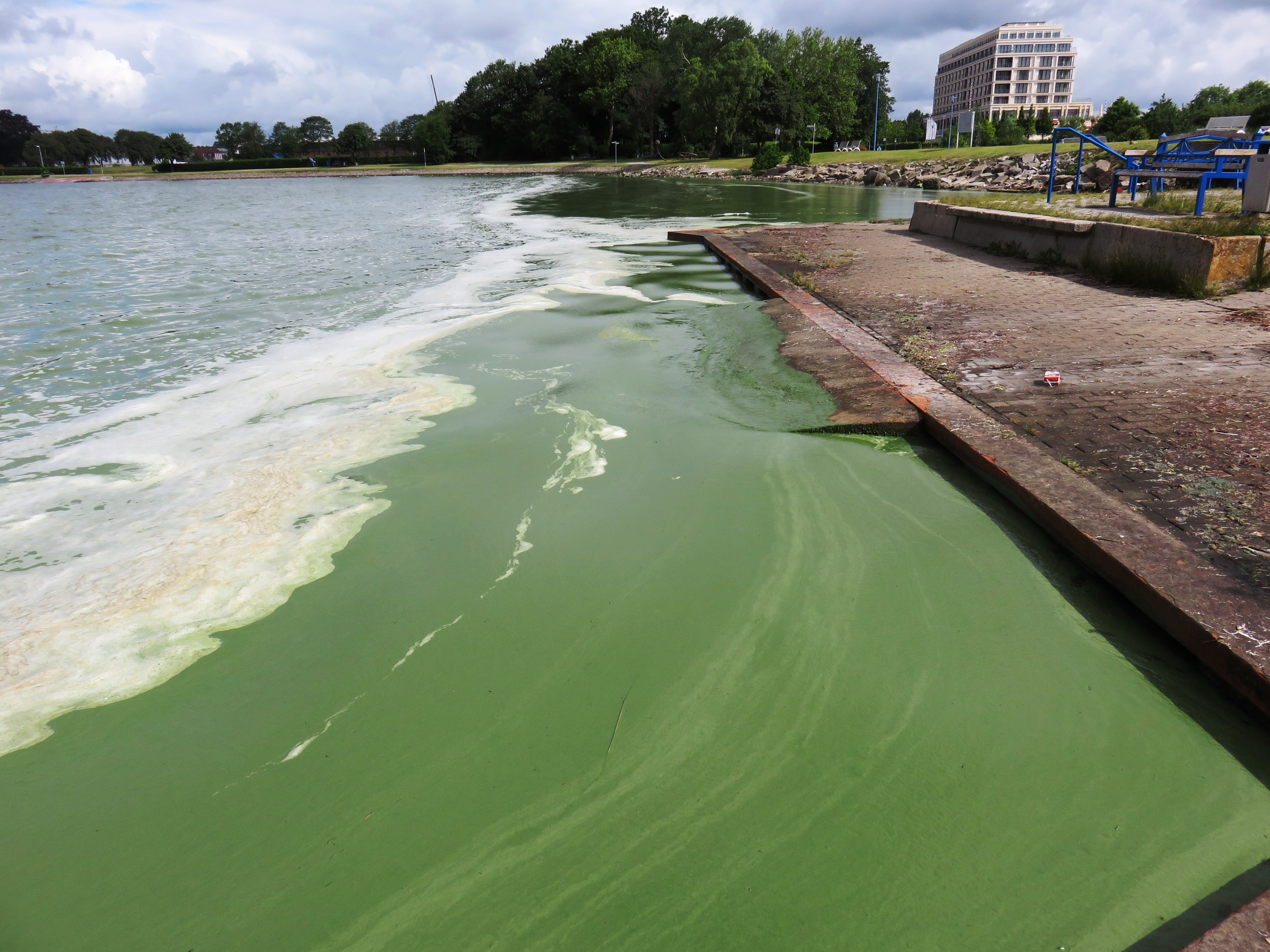
Cyanobacteria algae on the coast of northern Germany

HABs from cyanobacteria (blue-green algae) can appear as a foam, scum, or mat on or just below the surface of water and can take on various colors depending on their pigments. Cyanobacteria blooms in freshwater lakes or rivers may appear bright green, often with surface streaks that look like floating paint. Cyanobacterial blooms are a global problem.

Most blooms occur in warm waters with excessive nutrients. The harmful effects from such blooms are due to the toxins they produce or from using up oxygen in the water which can lead to fish die-offs. Not all algal blooms produce toxins, however, with some only discoloring water, producing a smelly odor, or adding a bad taste to the water. Unfortunately, it is not possible to tell if a bloom is harmful from just appearances, since sampling and microscopic examination is required. In many cases microscopy is not sufficient to tell the difference between toxic and non-toxic populations. In these cases, tools can be employed to measure the toxin level or to determine if the toxin-production genes are present.

== Terminology ==
In a narrow definition, harmful algal blooms are only those blooms that release toxins that affect other species. On the other hand, any algal bloom can cause dead zones due to low oxygen levels, and could therefore be called "harmful" in that sense. The usage of the term "harmful algal blooms" in the media and scientific literature is varied. In a broader definition, all "organisms and events are considered to be HABs if they negatively impact human health or socioeconomic interests or are detrimental to aquatic systems". A harmful algal bloom is "a societal concept rather than a scientific definition".

A similarly broad definition of HABs was adopted by the US Environmental Protection Agency in 2008 who stated that HABs include "potentially toxic (auxotrophic, heterotrophic) species and high-biomass producers that can cause hypoxia and anoxia and indiscriminate mortalities of marine life after reaching dense concentrations, whether or not toxins are produced".

=== Red tide ===
Harmful algal bloom in coastal areas are also often referred to as "red tides". The term "red tide" is derived from blooms of any of several species of dinoflagellate, such as Karenia brevis. However, the term is misleading since algal blooms can widely vary in color, and growth of algae is unrelated to the tides. Not all red tides are produced by dinoflagellates. The mixotrophic ciliate Mesodinium rubrum produces non-toxic blooms coloured deep red by chloroplasts it obtains from the algae it eats.

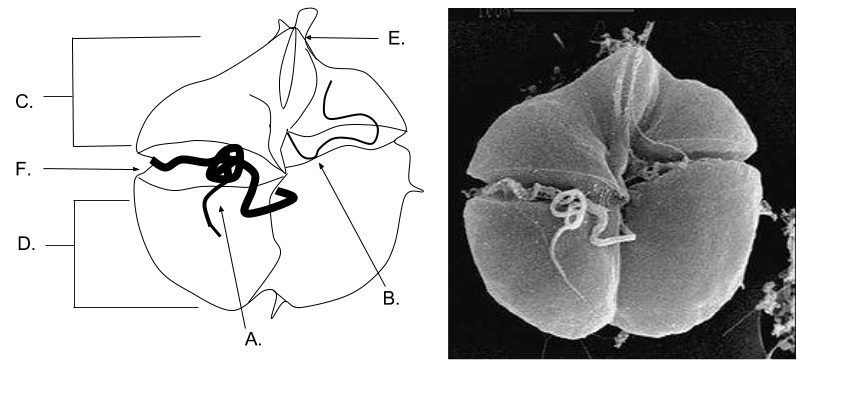
Karenia brevis, a dinoflagellate that caused a HAB event in the Gulf of Mexico

As a technical term, it is being replaced in favor of more precise terminology, including the generic term "harmful algal bloom" for harmful species, and "algal bloom" for benign species.

== Types ==
There are three main types of phytoplankton which can form into harmful algal blooms: cyanobacteria, dinoflagellates, and diatoms. All three are made up of microscopic floating organisms which, like plants, can create their own food from sunlight by means of photosynthesis. That ability makes the majority of them an essential part of the food web for small fish and other organisms.

=== Cyanobacteria ===
Harmful algal blooms in freshwater lakes and rivers, or at estuaries, where rivers flow into the ocean, are caused by cyanobacteria, which are commonly referred to as "blue-green algae", but are in fact prokaryotic bacteria, as opposed to algae which are eukaryotes. Some cyanobacteria, including the widespread genus Microcystis, can produce hazardous cyanotoxins such as microcystins, which are hepatotoxins that harm the liver of mammals. Other types of cyanobacteria can also produce hepatotoxins, as well as neurotoxins, cytotoxins, and endotoxins. Water purification plants may be unable to remove these toxins, leading to increasingly common localised advisories against drinking tap water, as happened in Toledo, Ohio in August 2014.

In August 2021, there were 47 lakes confirmed to have algal blooms in New York State alone. In September 2021, Spokane County's Environmental Programs issued a HAB alert for Newman Lake following tests showing potentially harmful toxicity levels for cyanobacteria, while in the same month record-high levels of microcystins were reported leading to an extended 'Do Not Drink' advisory for 280 households at Clear Lake, California's second-largest freshwater lake. Water conditions in Florida, meanwhile, continue to deteriorate under increasing nutrient inflows, causing severe HAB events in both freshwater and marine areas.

HABs also cause harm by blocking the sunlight used by plants and algae to photosynthesise, or by depleting the dissolved oxygen needed by fish and other aquatic animals, which can lead to fish die-offs. When such oxygen-depleted water covers a large area for an extended period of time, it can become hypoxic or even anoxic; these areas are commonly called dead zones. These dead zones can be the result of numerous different factors ranging from natural phenomenon to deliberate human intervention, and are not just limited to large bodies of fresh water as found in the great lakes, but are also prone to bodies of salt water as well.

=== Dual-stage life systems of algal species ===
Many of the species that form harmful algae blooms will undergo a dual-stage life system. These species will alternate between a benthic resting stage and a pelagic vegetative state. The benthic resting stage corresponds to when these species are resting near the ocean floor. In this stage, the species cells are waiting for optimal conditions so that they can move towards the surface. These species will then transition from the benthic resting stage into the pelagic vegetative state - where they are more active and found near the water body surface. In the pelagic vegetative state, these cells are able to grow and multiply. It is within the pelagic vegetative state that a bloom is able to occur - as the cells rapidly reproduce and take over the upper regions of the body of water.

The transition between these two life stages can have multiple effects on the algae bloom, such as rapid termination of the HAB as cells convert from the pelagic state to the benthic state. Many of the algal species that undergo this dual-stage life cycle are capable of rapid vertical migration. This migration is required for the movement from the benthic area of bodies of water to the pelagic zone. These species require immense amounts of energy as they pass through the various thermoclines, haloclines, and pycnoclines that are associated with the bodies of water in which these cells exist.

=== Diatoms and dinoflagellates (in marine coastal areas) ===
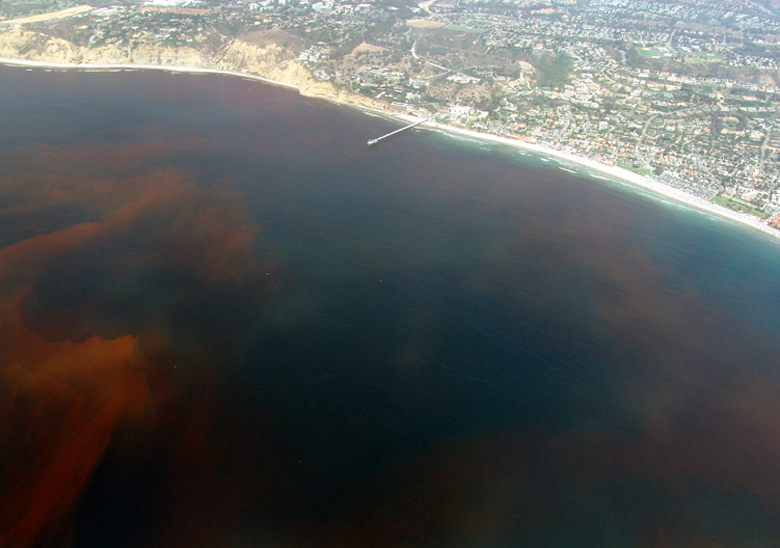
A harmful algal bloom event off the coast of San Diego, California

The other types of algae are diatoms and dinoflagellates, found primarily in marine environments, such as ocean coastlines or bays, where they can also form algal blooms. Coastal HABs are a natural phenomenon, although in many instances, particularly when they form close to coastlines or in estuaries, it has been shown that they are exacerbated by human-induced eutrophication and / or climate change. They can occur when warmer water, lower salinity, and nutrients reach certain levels, which then stimulates their growth. Most HAB algae are dinoflagellates. They are visible in water at a concentration of 1,000 algae cells/ml, while in dense blooms they can measure over 200,000/ml.

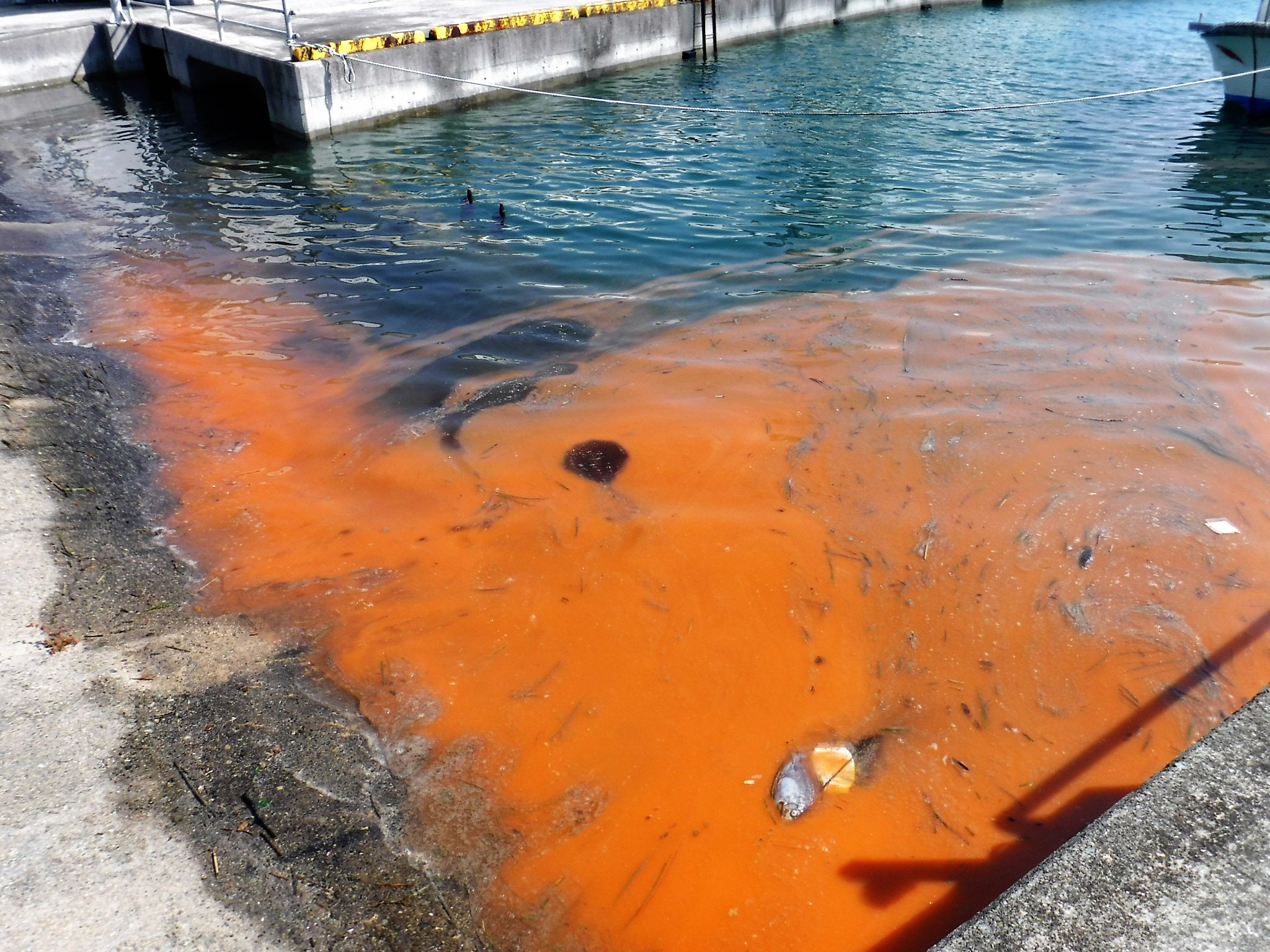
Harmful algal bloom in a harbor in Japan

Diatoms produce domoic acid, another neurotoxin, which can cause seizures in higher vertebrates and birds as it concentrates up the food chain. Domoic acid readily accumulates in the bodies of shellfish, sardines, and anchovies, which if then eaten by sea lions, otters, cetaceans, birds or people, can affect the nervous system causing serious injury or death. In the summer of 2015, the state governments closed important shellfish fisheries in Washington, Oregon, and California because of high concentrations of domoic acid in shellfish.

In the marine environment, single-celled, microscopic, plant-like organisms naturally occur in the well-lit surface layer of any body of water. These organisms, referred to as phytoplankton or microalgae, form the base of the food web upon which nearly all other marine organisms depend. Of the 5000+ species of marine phytoplankton that exist worldwide, about 2% are known to be harmful or toxic. Blooms of harmful algae can have large and varied impacts on marine ecosystems, depending on the species involved, the environment where they are found, and the mechanism by which they exert negative effects.

==== Common causative genera ====
Genera of diatoms and dinoflagellates that commonly cause harmful algal blooms in marine environments include:

- Gonyaulax
- Karenia
- Gymnodinium
- Dinophysis
- Noctiluca
- Chattonella
- Ceratium
- Amoebophrya
- Alexandrium
- Cochlodinium
- Pseudo-nitzschia

== Causes ==
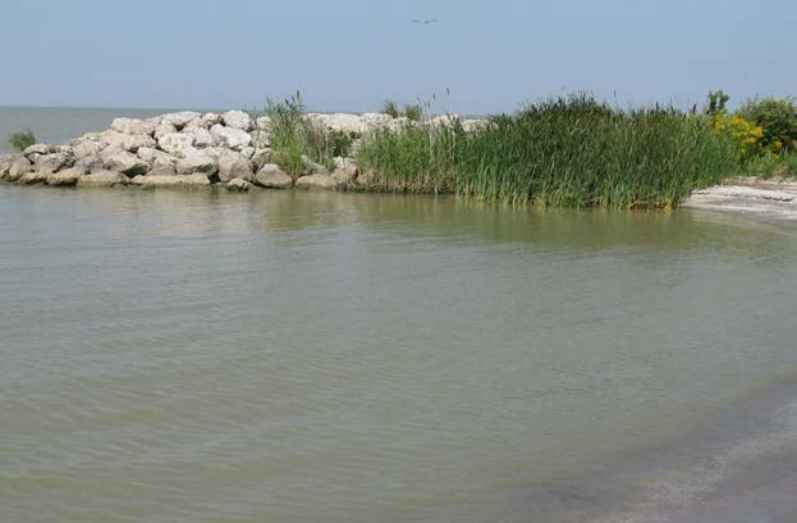
Harmful algal blooms do not have to be clearly visible. This shows a bloom with high cyanobacteria toxin levels (over 5 μ/l) yet the bloom is not easy to see.

It is sometimes unclear what causes specific HABs as their occurrence in some locations appears to be entirely natural, while in others they appear to be a result of human activities. There are many different species of algae that can form HABs, each with different environmental requirements for optimal growth. The frequency and severity of HABs in some parts of the world have been linked to increased nutrient loading from human activities. In other areas, HABs are a predictable seasonal occurrence resulting from coastal upwelling, a natural result of the movement of certain ocean currents.

The growth of marine phytoplankton (both non-toxic and toxic) is generally limited by the availability of nitrates and phosphates, which can be abundant in coastal upwelling zones as well as in agricultural run-off. The type of nitrates and phosphates available in the system are also a factor, since phytoplankton can grow at different rates depending on the relative abundance of these substances (e.g. ammonia, urea, nitrate ion).

A variety of other nutrient sources can also play an important role in affecting algal bloom formation, including iron, silica or carbon. Coastal water pollution produced by humans (including iron fertilization) and systematic increase in sea water temperature have also been suggested as possible contributing factors in HABs.

Among the causes of algal blooms are:

- Excess nutrients—phosphorus and nitrates—from fertilizers or sewage that are discharged to water bodies (also called nutrient pollution)
- thermal pollution from power plants and factories
- low water levels in inland waterways and lakes, which reduces water flow and increases water temperatures
- invasive filter feeders—especially Zebra mussels, Dreissena polymorpha—which preferentially eat non-toxic algae, competitors to harmful algae

=== Nutrients ===
Nutrients enter freshwater or marine environments as surface runoff from agricultural pollution and urban runoff from fertilized lawns, golf courses and other landscaped properties; and from sewage treatment plants that lack nutrient control systems. Additional nutrients are introduced from atmospheric pollution. Coastal areas worldwide, especially wetlands and estuaries, coral reefs and swamps, are prone to being overloaded with those nutrients. Most of the large cities along the Mediterranean Sea, for example, discharge all of their sewage into the sea untreated. The same is true for most coastal developing countries, while in parts of the developing world, as much as 70% of wastewater from large cities may re-enter water systems without being treated.

Residual nutrients in treated wastewater can also accumulate in downstream source water areas and fuel eutrophication, which leads progressively to a cyanobacteria-dominated system characterized by seasonal HABs. As more wastewater treatment infrastructure is built, more treated wastewater is returned to the natural water system, leading to a significant increase in these residual nutrients.

Residual nutrients combine with nutrients from other sources to increase the sediment nutrient stockpile that is the driving force behind phase shifts to entrenched eutrophic conditions.

This contributes to the ongoing degradation of dams, lakes, rivers, and reservoirs - source water areas that are starting to become known as ecological infrastructure, placing increasing pressure on wastewater treatment works and water purification plants. Such pressures, in turn, intensify seasonal HABs.

=== Iron fertilization ===
Iron fertilization is the intentional introduction of iron-containing compounds (like iron sulfate) to iron-poor areas of the ocean surface to stimulate phytoplankton production. This is intended to enhance biological productivity and/or accelerate carbon dioxide (CO_{2}) sequestration from the atmosphere. Iron is a trace element necessary for photosynthesis in plants. It is highly insoluble in sea water and in a variety of locations is the limiting nutrient for phytoplankton growth. Large algal blooms can be created by supplying iron to iron-deficient ocean waters.

Iron is a trace element in the ocean and its presence is vital for photosynthesis in plants such as phytoplankton. Adding iron to deficient areas promotes phytoplankton growth.

=== Climate change ===
Climate change contributes to warmer waters which makes conditions more favorable for algae growth in more regions and farther north. In general, still, warm, shallow water, combined with high-nutrient conditions in lakes or rivers, increases the risk of harmful algal blooms. Warming of summer surface temperatures of lakes, which rose by 0.34 °C per decade (0.34 °C.decade^{-1}) between 1985 and 2009 due to global warming, also will likely increase algal blooming by 20% over the next century.

Although the drivers of harmful algal blooms are poorly understood, they appear to have increased in range expansion and frequency in coastal areas since the 1980s. This is the result of human induced factors such as increased nutrient inputs (nutrient pollution) and climate change (in particular the warming of water temperatures). The parameters that affect the formation of HABs are ocean warming, marine heatwaves, oxygen loss, eutrophication and water pollution.

=== Causes or contributing factors of coastal HABs ===
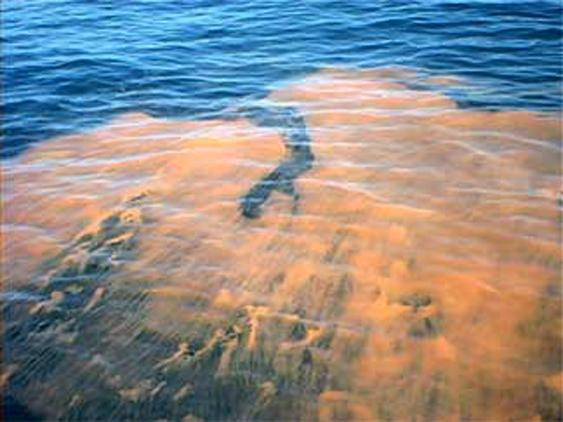
A harmful coastal algal bloom event

HABs contain dense concentrations of organisms and appear as discolored water, often reddish-brown in color. It is a natural phenomenon, but the exact cause or combination of factors that result in a HAB event are not necessarily known. Three key natural factors are thought to play an important role in a bloom - salinity, temperature, and wind. HABs cause economic harm, so outbreaks are carefully monitored. For example, the Florida Fish and Wildlife Conservation Commission provides an up-to-date status report on HABs in Florida. The Texas Parks and Wildlife Department also provides a status report. While no particular cause of HABs has been found, many different factors can contribute to their presence. These factors can include water pollution, which originates from sources such as human sewage and agricultural runoff.

The occurrence of HABs in some locations appears to be entirely natural (algal blooms are a seasonal occurrence resulting from coastal upwelling, a natural result of the movement of certain ocean currents) while in others they appear to be a result of increased nutrient pollution from human activities.

The growth of marine phytoplankton is generally limited by the availability of nitrates and phosphates, which can be abundant in agricultural run-off as well as coastal upwelling zones. Other factors such as iron-rich dust influx from large desert areas such as the Sahara Desert are thought to play a major role in causing HAB events. Some algal blooms on the Pacific Coast have also been linked to occurrences of large-scale climatic oscillations such as El Niño events.

=== Other causes ===
Other factors such as iron-rich dust influx from large desert areas such as the Sahara are thought to play a role in causing HABs. Some algal blooms on the Pacific coast have also been linked to natural occurrences of large-scale climatic oscillations such as El Niño events. HABs are also linked to heavy rainfall. HABs in the Gulf of Mexico were witnessed in the early 1500s by explorer Cabeza de Vaca.

== Number and sizes ==
The number of reported harmful algal blooms (cyanobacterial) has been increasing throughout the world. It is unclear whether the apparent increase in frequency and severity of HABs in various parts of the world is in fact a real increase or is due to increased observation effort and advances in species identification technology.

In 2008, the U.S. government prepared a report on the problem, "Harmful Algal Bloom Management and Response: Assessment and Plan". The report recognized the seriousness of the problem:

It is widely believed that the frequency and geographic distribution of HABs have been increasing worldwide. All U.S. coastal states have experienced HABs over the last decade, and new species have emerged in some locations that were not previously known to cause problems. HAB frequency is also thought to be increasing in freshwater systems.

Researchers have reported the growth of HABs in Europe, Africa and Australia. Those have included blooms on some of the African Great Lakes, such as Lake Victoria, the second largest freshwater lake in the world. India has been reporting an increase in the number of blooms each year. In 1977, Hong Kong reported its first coastal HAB. By 1987 they were getting an average of 35 per year. Additionally, there have been reports of harmful algal blooms throughout popular Canadian lakes such as Beaver Lake and Quamichan Lake. These blooms were responsible for the deaths of a few animals and led to swimming advisories.

Global warming and pollution is causing algal blooms to form in places previously considered "impossible" or rare for them to exist, such as under the ice sheets in the Arctic, in Antarctica, the Himalayan Mountains, the Rocky Mountains, and in the Sierra Nevada Mountains.

In the U.S., every coastal state has had harmful algal blooms over the last decade and new species have emerged in new locations that were not previously known to have caused problems. Inland, major rivers have seen an increase in their size and frequency. In 2015 the Ohio River had a bloom which stretched an "unprecedented" 650 miles (1,050 km) into adjoining states and tested positive for toxins, which created drinking water and recreation problems. A portion of Utah's Jordan River was closed due to toxic algal bloom in 2016. Future predictions were made based on climate change projections and Hydrological models: from 2024 to 2090, the mean number of HAB occurrences in U.S. lakes would rise from 7 days to 18–39 days.

Off the west coast of South Africa, HABs caused by Alexandrium catanella occur every spring. These blooms of organisms cause severe disruptions in fisheries of these waters as the toxins in the phytoplankton cause filter-feeding shellfish in affected waters to become poisonous for human consumption.

== Harmful effects ==
As algal blooms grow, they deplete the oxygen in the water and block sunlight from reaching fish and plants. Such blooms can last from a few days to many months. With less light, plants beneath the bloom can die and fish can starve. The dense population of a bloom reduces oxygen saturation during the night by respiration. And when the algae eventually die off, the microbes which decompose the dead algae use up even more oxygen, which in turn causes more fish to die or leave the area.

When oxygen continues to be depleted by blooms it can lead to hypoxic dead zones, where neither fish nor plants are able to survive. These dead zones in the case of the Chesapeake Bay, where they are a normal occurrence, are also suspected of being a major source of methane.

Scientists have found that HABs were a prominent feature of previous mass extinction events, including the End-Permian Extinction.

=== Human health ===
Tests have shown some toxins near blooms can be in the air and thereby be inhaled, which could affect health. This occurs due to the aerosolization of the toxins which are then transported by the wind. Not all algal blooms release harmful toxins into the atmosphere, because it is dependent on both the species and environmental conditions. Some species of microalgae/bacteria release toxins through cell lysis induced by physical stresses such as wave action.

Other species release toxins through lysis induced by cellular processes, viral stresses, or chemical stresses in the water column. The toxins are mainly aerosolized into spray aerosols caused by wave action. The surface movement of water creates bubbles in the water, and when these bubbles reach the surface they pop. When the bubbles pop they eject water droplets which contain lysed cell material from harmful algal blooms (HAB's). Once ejected the aerosolized toxins are transported by the wind. A 2017 study found that sea spray aerosol can be transported up to 1,000 km by the wind.

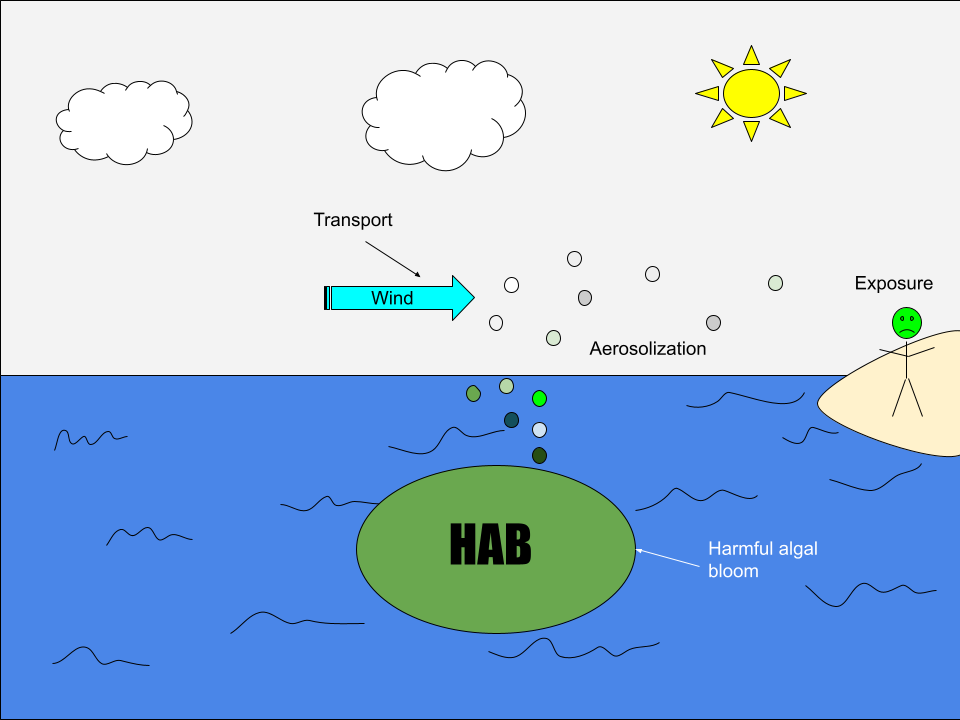
The process of HAB toxin aerosolization, wind transport, and human exposure.

It is important to stay informed of local policies and response measures that are in place for HAB's even if you do not live directly on the coast because of the distances that these toxins can be transported.

==== One Health Harmful Algal Bloom System (OHHABS) ====
The One Health Harmful Algal Bloom System (OHHABS), launched by the U.S. Centers for Disease Control and Prevention (CDC) in 2016, is the only national public health surveillance system in the United States that systematically collects data on harmful algal blooms (HABs) and the human and animal illnesses they cause. State and territorial health departments, often in collaboration with environmental and animal health partners, voluntarily report HAB events in freshwater, marine, or brackish waters, along with associated illnesses in people, pets, livestock, and wildlife. Reports can also include blooms without identified illnesses or foodborne cases linked to HAB toxins (e.g., contaminated seafood).

HABs represent a quintessential One Health challenge because they simultaneously affect human health (through toxin exposure via water, air, or food), animal health (mass die-offs in fish, birds, marine mammals, and pets), and the shared environment (eutrophication, dead zones, and climate-amplified blooms). Prior to OHHABS, surveillance was fragmented across disciplines, limiting the ability to detect patterns or respond effectively. The system addresses this gap by integrating data across sectors, enabling a more complete picture of risks and supporting prevention as blooms increase globally due to nutrient pollution and climate change.

Data collected through OHHABS directly informs mitigation and prevention strategies. For example, reported events and illnesses allow public health officials to issue timely advisories, close affected beaches or water bodies, and educate communities on avoiding exposure (e.g., not swimming in or drinking bloom water, protecting pets). Animal cases trigger rapid veterinary response guidance, such as supportive care that can save lives in pets and livestock. Aggregated national data (e.g., in 2022 alone, 15 states reported 372 HAB events, 95 human illnesses, and over 102,000 animal illnesses) help identify high-risk areas, track trends, and advocate for upstream environmental interventions like nutrient runoff reduction. Outbreaks are also reported to the National Outbreak Reporting System for coordinated response.

By embedding One Health principles into routine surveillance, OHHABS demonstrates how integrated data collection can translate into practical prevention, protecting human and animal health while addressing the environmental drivers of HABs.

==== Food ====
Eating fish or shellfish from lakes with a bloom nearby is not recommended. Potent toxins are accumulated in shellfish that feed on the algae. If the shellfish are consumed, various types of poisoning may result. These include amnesic shellfish poisoning (ASP), diarrhetic shellfish poisoning, neurotoxic shellfish poisoning, and paralytic shellfish poisoning. A 2002 study has shown that algal toxins may be the cause for as many as 60,000 intoxication cases in the world each year.

In 1987, a new illness emerged: amnesic shellfish poisoning (ASP). People who had eaten mussels from Prince Edward Island were found to have ASP. The illness was caused by domoic acid, produced by a diatom found in the area where the mussels were cultivated. A 2013 study found that toxic paralytic shellfish poisoning in the Philippines during HABs has caused at least 120 deaths over a few decades.

After a 2014 HAB incident in Monterey Bay, California, health officials warned people not to eat certain parts of anchovy, sardines, or crab caught in the bay. In 2015, most shellfish fisheries in Washington, Oregon and California were shut down because of high concentrations of toxic domoic acid in shellfish. People have been warned that inhaling vapors from waves or wind during a HAB event may cause asthma attacks or lead to other respiratory ailments.

In 2018, agricultural officials in Utah worried that even crops could become contaminated if irrigated with toxic water, although they admit that they can't measure contamination accurately because of so many variables in farming. They issued warnings to residents, however, out of caution.

==== Drinking water ====
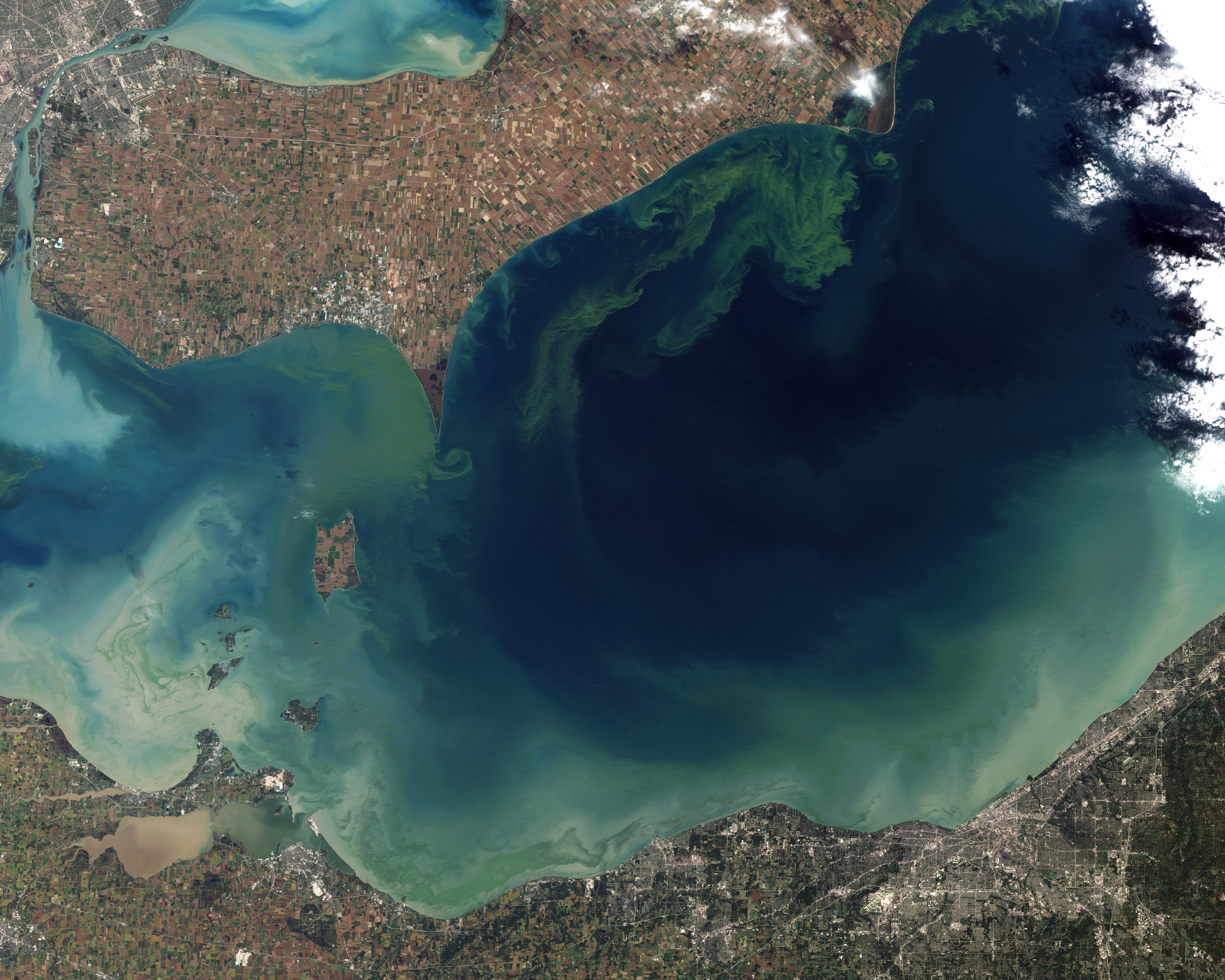
A satellite image of Lake Erie during a harmful 2011 algal bloom

Persons are generally warned not to enter or drink water from algal blooms, or let their pets swim in the water since many pets have died from algal blooms. In at least one case, people began getting sick before warnings were issued. There is no treatment available for animals, including livestock cattle, if they drink from algal blooms where such toxins are present. Pets are advised to be kept away from algal blooms to avoid contact.

In some locations visitors have been warned not to even touch the water. Boaters have been told that toxins in the water can be inhaled from the spray from wind or waves. Ocean beaches, lakes and rivers have been closed due to algal blooms. After a dog died in 2015 from swimming in a bloom in California's Russian River, officials likewise posted warnings for parts of the river. Boiling the water at home before drinking does not remove the toxins.

In August 2014, Toledo, Ohio, advised its 500,000 residents to not drink tap water as the high toxin level from an algal bloom in western Lake Erie had affected their water treatment plant's ability to treat the water to a safe level. The emergency required using bottled water for all normal uses except showering, which seriously affected public services and commercial businesses. The bloom returned in 2015 and was forecast again for the summer of 2016.

In 2004, a bloom in Kisumu Bay, which is the drinking water source for 500,000 people in Kisumu, Kenya, suffered from similar water contamination. In China, water was cut off to residents in 2007 due to an algal bloom in its third largest lake, which forced 2 million people to use bottled water. A smaller water shut-down in China affected 15,000 residents two years later at a different location. Australia in 2016 also had to cut off water to farmers.

Alan Steinman of Grand Valley State University has explained that among the major causes for the algal blooms in general, and Lake Erie specifically, is because blue-green algae thrive with high nutrients, along with warm and calm water. Lake Erie is more prone to blooms because it has a high nutrient level and is shallow, which causes it to warm up more quickly during the summer.

Symptoms from drinking toxic water can show up within a few hours after exposure. They can include nausea, vomiting, and diarrhea, or trigger headaches and gastrointestinal problems. Although rare, liver toxicity can cause death. Those symptoms can then lead to dehydration, another major concern. In high concentrations, the toxins in the algal waters when simply touched can cause skin rashes, irritate the eyes, nose, mouth or throat. Those with suspected symptoms are told to call a doctor if symptoms persist or they can't hold down fluids after 24 hours.

In studies at the population level bloom coverage has been significantly related to the risk of non-alcoholic liver disease death.

==== Neurological disorders ====
Toxic algae blooms are thought to play a role in humans developing degenerative neurological disorders such as amyotrophic lateral sclerosis and Parkinson's disease.

Less than one percent of algal blooms produce hazardous toxins, such as microcystins. Although blue-green or other algae do not usually pose a direct threat to health, the toxins (poisons) which they produce are considered dangerous to humans, land animals, sea mammals, birds and fish when the toxins are ingested. The toxins are neurotoxins which destroy nerve tissue which can affect the nervous system, brain, and liver, and can lead to death.

==== Effects on humans from harmful algal blooms in marine environments ====
Humans are affected by the HAB species by ingesting improperly harvested shellfish, breathing in aerosolized brevetoxins (i.e. PbTx or Ptychodiscus toxins) and in some cases skin contact. The brevetoxins bind to voltage-gated sodium channels, important structures of cell membranes. Binding results in persistent activation of nerve cells, which interferes with neural transmission leading to health problems. These toxins are created within the unicellular organism, or as a metabolic product.

The two major types of brevetoxin compounds have similar but distinct backbone structures. PbTx-2 is the primary intracellular brevetoxin produced by K. brevis blooms. Over time, the PbTx-2 brevetoxin can be converted to PbTx-3 through metabolic changes. Researchers found that PbTx-2 has been the primary intracellular brevetoxin that converts over time into PbTx-3.

In the U.S., the seafood consumed by humans is tested regularly for toxins by the USDA to ensure safe consumption. Such testing is common in other nations. However, improper harvesting of shellfish can cause paralytic shellfish poisoning and neurotoxic shellfish poisoning in humans. Some symptoms include drowsiness, diarrhea, nausea, loss of motor control, tingling, numbing or aching of extremities, incoherence, and respiratory paralysis. Reports of skin irritation after swimming in the ocean during a HAB are common.

When the HAB cells rupture, they release extracellular brevetoxins into the environment. Some of those stay in the ocean, while other particles get aerosolized. During onshore winds, brevetoxins can become aerosolized by bubble-mediated transport, causing respiratory irritation, bronchoconstriction, coughing, and wheezing, among other symptoms.

It is recommended to avoid contact with wind-blown aerosolized toxin. Some individuals report a decrease in respiratory function after only 1 hour of exposure to a K. brevis red-tide beach and these symptoms may last for days. People with severe or persistent respiratory conditions (such as chronic lung disease or asthma) may experience stronger adverse reactions.

The National Oceanic and Atmospheric Administration's National Ocean Service provides a public conditions report identifying possible respiratory irritation impacts in areas affected by HABs.

=== Economic impact ===
==== Recreation and tourism ====
The hazards which accompany harmful algal blooms have hindered visitors' enjoyment of beaches and lakes in places in the U.S. such as Florida, California, Vermont, and Utah. Persons hoping to enjoy their vacations or days off have been kept away to the detriment of local economies. Lakes and rivers in North Dakota, Minnesota, Utah, California and Ohio have had signs posted warning about the potential of health risk.

Similar blooms have become more common in Europe, with France among the countries reporting them. In the summer of 2009, beaches in northern Brittany became covered by tonnes of potentially lethal rotting green algae. A horse being ridden along the beach collapsed and died from fumes given off by the rotting algae.

The economic damage resulting from lost business has become a serious concern. According to a 2016 report, the four main economic impacts from harmful algal blooms come from damage to human health, fisheries, tourism and recreation, and the cost of monitoring and management of area where blooms appear. EPA estimates that algal blooms impact 65 percent of the country's major estuaries, with an annual cost of $2.2 billion. In the U.S. there are an estimated 166 coastal dead zones. Because data collection has been more difficult and limited from sources outside the U.S., most of the estimates as of 2016 have been primarily for the U.S.

In port cities in the Shandong Province of eastern China, residents are no longer surprised when massive algal blooms arrive each year and inundate beaches. Prior to the Beijing Olympics in 2008, over 10,000 people worked to clear 20,000 tons of dead algae from beaches. In 2013, another bloom in China, thought to be its largest ever, covered an area of 7,500 square miles, and was followed by another in 2015 which blanketed an even greater 13,500 square miles. The blooms in China are thought to be caused by pollution from untreated agricultural and industrial discharges into rivers leading to the ocean.

==== Fisheries industry ====
In 1976, a short-term, relatively small, dead zone off the coasts of New York and New Jersey cost commercial and recreational fisheries over $500 million. In 1998, a HAB in Hong Kong killed over $10 million in high-value fish.

In 2009, the economic impact for the state of Washington's coastal counties dependent on its fishing industry was estimated to be $22 million. In 2016, the U.S. seafood industry expected future lost revenue could amount to $900 million annually.

NOAA has provided a few cost estimates for various blooms over the past few years: $10.3 million in 2011 due to a HAB at Texas oyster landings; $2.4 million lost income by tribal commerce from 2015 fishery closures in the pacific northwest; $40 million from Washington state's loss of tourism from the same fishery closure.

Along with damage to businesses, the toll from human sickness results in lost wages and damaged health. The costs of medical treatment, investigation by health agencies through water sampling and testing, and the posting of warning signs at effected locations is also costly.

The closures applied to areas where this algae bloom occurs has a big negative impact of the fishing industries, add to that the high fish mortality that follows, the increase in price due to the shortage of fish available and decrease in the demand for seafood due to the fear of contamination by toxins. This causes a big economic loss for the industry.

Economic costs are estimated to rise. In June 2015, for instance, the largest known toxic HAB forced the shutdown of the west coast shellfish industry, the first time that has ever happened. One Seattle NOAA expert commented, "This is unprecedented in terms of the extent and magnitude of this harmful algal bloom and the warm water conditions we're seeing offshore...." The bloom covered a range from Santa Barbara, California northward to Alaska.

The negative impact on fish can be even more severe when they are confined to pens, as they are in fish farms. In 2007 a fish farm in British Columbia lost 260 tons of salmon as a result of blooms, and in 2016 a farm in Chile lost 23 million salmon after an algal bloom.

=== Environmental impact ===
==== Dead zones ====
The presence of harmful algal blooms can lead to hypoxia or anoxia in a body of water. The depletion of oxygen within a body of water can lead to the creation of a dead zone. Dead zones occur when a body of water has become unsuitable for organism survival in that location. HAB's cause dead zones by consuming oxygen in these bodies of water - leaving minimal oxygen available to other marine organisms. When the HAB's die, their bodies will sink to the bottom of the body of water - as the decaying of their bodies (through bacteria) is what causes the consumption of oxygen. Once oxygen levels get so low, the HAB's have placed the body of water in hypoxia - and these low oxygen levels will cause marine organisms to seek out better suited locations for their survival.

Blooms can harm the environment even without producing toxins by depleting oxygen from the water when growing and while decaying after they die. Blooms can also block sunlight to organisms living beneath it. A record-breaking number and size of blooms have formed in the Pacific coast, in Lake Erie, in the Chesapeake Bay and in the Gulf of Mexico, where a number of dead zones were created as a result. In the 1960s the number of dead zones worldwide was 49; the number rose to over 400 by 2008.

Among the largest dead zones were those in northern Europe's Baltic Sea and the Gulf of Mexico, which affects a $2.8 billion U.S. fish industry. Unfortunately, dead zones rarely recover and usually grow in size. One of the few dead zones to ever recover was in the Black Sea, which returned to normal fairly quickly after the collapse of the Soviet Union in the 1990s due to a resulting reduction in fertilizer use.

The US Coast Guard Cutter Healy ferried scientists to 26 study sites in the Arctic, where blooms ranged in concentration from high (red) to low (purple).

Researcher David Mayer of Clark University lowers a video camera below the ice to observe a dense bloom of phytoplankton.

==== Fish die-offs ====
Massive fish die-offs have been caused by HABs. In 2016, 23 million salmon which were being farmed in Chile died from a toxic algae bloom. To get rid of the dead fish, the ones fit for consumption were made into fishmeal and the rest were dumped 60 miles offshore to avoid risks to human health. The economic cost of that die-off is estimated to have been $800 million. Environmental expert Lester Brown has written that the farming of salmon and shrimp in offshore ponds concentrates waste, which contributes to eutrophication and the creation of dead zones.

Other countries have reported similar impacts, with cities such as Rio de Janeiro, Brazil seeing major fish die-offs from blooms becoming a common occurrence. In early 2015, Rio collected an estimated 50 tons of dead fish from the lagoon where water events in the 2016 Olympics were planned to take place.

The Monterey Bay has suffered from harmful algal blooms, most recently in 2015: "Periodic blooms of toxin-producing Pseudo-nitzschia diatoms have been documented for over 25 years in Monterey Bay and elsewhere along the U.S. west coast. During large blooms, the toxin accumulates in shellfish and small fish such as anchovies and sardines that feed on algae, forcing the closure of some fisheries and poisoning marine mammals and birds that feed on contaminated fish." Similar fish die-offs from toxic algae or lack of oxygen have been seen in Russia, Colombia, Vietnam, China, Canada, Turkey, Indonesia, and France.

==== Land animal deaths ====
Land animals, including livestock and pets have been affected. Dogs have died from the toxins after swimming in algal blooms. Warnings have come from government agencies in the state of Ohio, which noted that many dogs and livestock deaths resulted from HAB exposure in the U.S. and other countries. They also noted in a 2003 report that during the previous 30 years, they have seen more frequent and longer-lasting harmful algal blooms." In 50 countries and 27 states that year there were reports of human and animal illnesses linked to algal toxins. In Australia, the department of agriculture warned farmers that the toxins from a HAB had the "potential to kill large numbers of livestock very quickly."

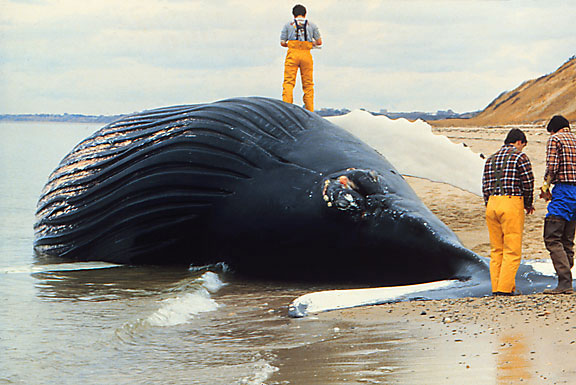
Whales can be killed by harmful algal blooms.

Marine mammals have been seriously harmed, as over 50 percent of unusual marine mammal deaths are caused by harmful algal blooms. In 1999, over 65 bottlenose dolphins died during a coastal HAB in Florida. In 2013 a HAB in southwest Florida killed a record number of Manatee. Whales have also died in large numbers. During the period from 2005 to 2014, Argentina reported an average 65 baby whales dying which experts have linked to algal blooms. A whale expert there expects the whale population to be reduced significantly.

In 2003, off Cape Cod in the North Atlantic, at least 12 humpback whales died from toxic algae from a HAB. In 2015 Alaska and British Columbia reported many humpback whales had likely died from HAB toxins, with 30 having washed ashore in Alaska. "Our leading theory at this point is that the harmful algal bloom has contributed to the deaths," said a NOAA spokesperson.

Birds have died after eating dead fish contaminated with toxic algae. Rotting and decaying fish are eaten by birds such as pelicans, seagulls, cormorants, and possibly marine or land mammals, which then become poisoned. The nervous systems of dead birds were examined and had failed from the toxin's effect. On the Oregon and Washington coast, a thousand scoters, or sea ducks, were also killed in 2009. "This is huge," said a university professor. As dying or dead birds washed up on the shore, wildlife agencies went into "an emergency crisis mode."

It has even been suggested that harmful algal blooms are responsible for the deaths of animals found in fossil troves, such as the dozens of cetacean skeletons found at Cerro Ballena.

=== Effects on marine ecosystems ===
Harmful algal blooms in marine ecosystems have been observed to cause adverse effects to a wide variety of aquatic organisms, most notably marine mammals, sea turtles, seabirds and finfish. The impacts of HAB toxins on these groups can include harmful changes to their developmental, immunological, neurological, or reproductive capacities. The most conspicuous effects of HABs on marine wildlife are large-scale mortality events associated with toxin-producing blooms. For example, a mass mortality event of 107 bottlenose dolphins occurred along the Florida panhandle in the spring of 2004 due to ingestion of contaminated menhaden with high levels of brevetoxin. Manatee mortalities have also been attributed to brevetoxin but unlike dolphins, the main toxin vector was endemic seagrass species (Thalassia testudinum) in which high concentrations of brevetoxins were detected and subsequently found as a main component of the stomach contents of manatees.

Additional marine mammal species, like the highly endangered North Atlantic right whale, have been exposed to neurotoxins by preying on highly contaminated zooplankton. With the summertime habitat of this species overlapping with seasonal blooms of the toxic dinoflagellate Alexandrium fundyense, and subsequent copepod grazing, foraging right whales will ingest large concentrations of these contaminated copepods. Ingestion of such contaminated prey can affect respiratory capabilities, feeding behavior, and ultimately the reproductive condition of the population.

Immune system responses have been affected by brevetoxin exposure in another critically endangered species, the loggerhead sea turtle. Brevetoxin exposure, from inhalation of aerosolized toxins and ingestion of contaminated prey, can have clinical signs of increased lethargy and muscle weakness in loggerhead sea turtles causing these animals to wash ashore in a decreased metabolic state with increases of immune system responses upon blood analysis.

Examples of common harmful effects of HABs include:

1. the production of neurotoxins which cause mass mortalities in fish, seabirds, sea turtles, and marine mammals
2. human illness or death from consumption of seafood contaminated by toxic algae
3. mechanical damage to other organisms, such as disruption of epithelial gill tissues in fish, resulting in asphyxiation
4. oxygen depletion of the water column (hypoxia or anoxia) from cellular respiration and bacterial degradation

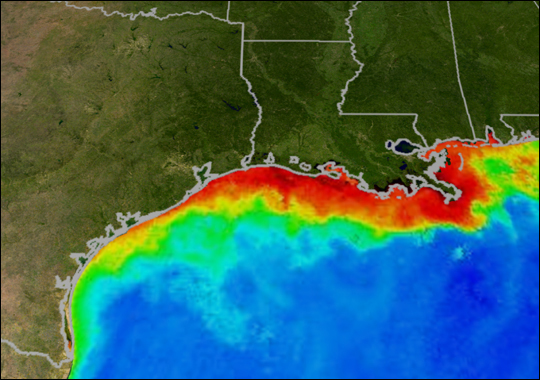
Dead zone in the southern U.S.

==== Marine life exposure ====
HABs occur naturally off coasts all over the world. Marine dinoflagellates produce ichthyotoxins. Where HABs occur, dead fish wash up on shore for up to two weeks after a HAB has been through the area. In addition to killing fish, the toxic algae contaminate shellfish. Some mollusks are not susceptible to the toxin, and store it in their fatty tissues. By consuming the organisms responsible for HABs, shellfish can accumulate and retain saxitoxin produced by these organisms. Saxitoxin blocks sodium channels and ingestion can cause paralysis within 30 minutes.

In addition to directly harming marine animals and vegetation loss, harmful algal blooms can also lead to ocean acidification, which occurs when the amount of carbon dioxide in the water is increased to unnatural levels. Ocean acidification slows the growth of certain species of fish and shellfish, and even prevents shell formation in certain species of mollusks. These subtle, small changes can add up over time to cause chain reactions and devastating effects on whole marine ecosystems.

Other animals that eat exposed shellfish are susceptible to the neurotoxin, which may lead to neurotoxic shellfish poisoning and sometimes even death. Most mollusks and clams filter feed, which results in higher concentrations of the toxin than just drinking the water. Scaup, for example, are diving ducks whose diet mainly consists of mollusks. When scaup eat the filter-feeding shellfish that have accumulated high levels of the HAB toxin, their population becomes a prime target for poisoning. However, even birds that do not eat mollusks can be affected by simply eating dead fish on the beach or drinking the water.

The toxins released by the blooms can kill marine animals including dolphins, sea turtles, birds, and manatees. The Florida Manatee, a subspecies of the West Indian Manatee, is a species often impacted by red tide blooms. Florida manatees are often exposed to the poisonous red-tide toxins either by consumption or inhalation. There are many small barnacles, crustaceans, and other epiphytes that grow on the blades of seagrass. These tiny creatures filter particles from the water around them and use these particles as their main food source. During red tide blooms, they also filter the toxic red tide cells from the water, which then becomes concentrated inside them.

Although these toxins do not harm epiphytes, they are extremely poisonous to marine creatures who consume (or accidentally consume) the exposed epiphytes, such as manatees. When manatees unknowingly consume exposed epiphytes while grazing on sea grass, the toxins are subsequently released from the epiphytes and ingested by the manatees. In addition to consumption, manatees may also become exposed to air-borne Brevetoxins released from harmful red-tide cells when passing through algal blooms.

Manatees have an immunoresponse to HABs and their toxins that can make them even more susceptible to other stressors. Due to this susceptibility, manatees can die from either the immediate, or the after effects of the HAB. In addition to causing manatee mortalities, red-tide exposure also causes severe sublethal health problems among Florida manatee populations. Studies have shown that red-tide exposure among free-ranging Florida manatees has been shown to negatively impact immune functioning by causing increased inflammation, a reduction in lymphocyte proliferation responses, and oxidative stress.

Fish such as Atlantic herring, American pollock, winter flounder, Atlantic salmon, and cod were dosed orally with these toxins in an experiment, and within minutes the subjects started to exhibit a loss of equilibrium and began to swim in an irregular, jerking pattern, followed by paralysis and shallow, arrhythmic breathing and eventually death, after about an hour. HABs have been shown to have a negative effect also in the memory functions of sea lions.

== Potential remedies ==
=== Reducing nutrient runoff ===
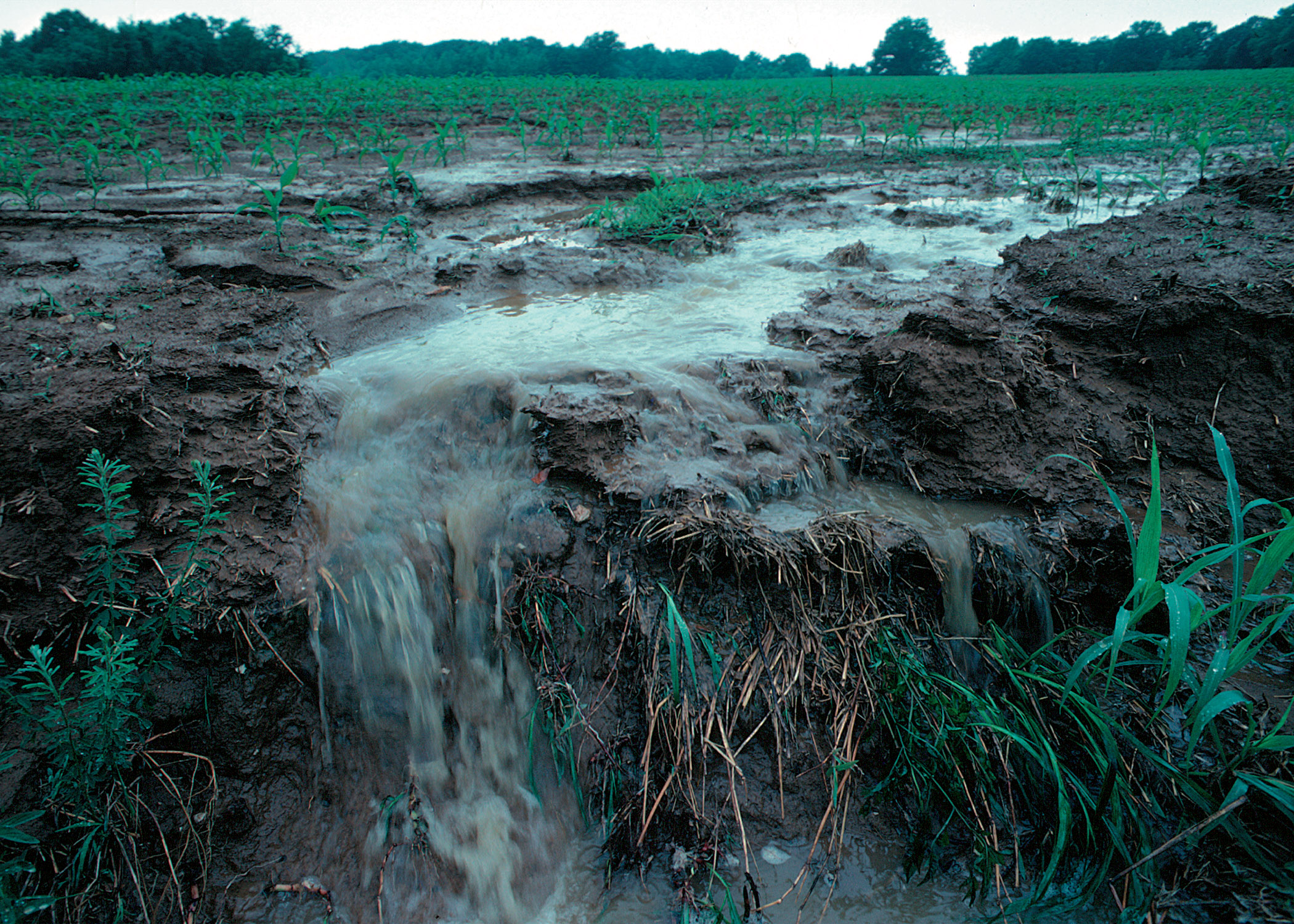
Soil and fertilizer runoff from a farm after heavy rains

Since many algal blooms are caused by a major influx of nutrient-rich runoff into a water body, programs to treat wastewater, reduce the overuse of fertilizers in agriculture and reducing the bulk flow of runoff can be effective for reducing severe algal blooms at river mouths, estuaries, and the ocean directly in front of the river's mouth.

The nitrates and phosphorus in fertilizers cause algal blooms when they run off into lakes and rivers after heavy rains. Modifications in farming methods have been suggested, such as only using fertilizer in a targeted way at the appropriate time exactly where it can do the most good for crops to reduce potential runoff. A method used successfully is drip irrigation, which instead of widely dispersing fertilizers on fields, drip-irrigates plant roots through a network of tubes and emitters, leaving no traces of fertilizer to be washed away. Drip irrigation also prevents the formation of algal blooms in reservoirs for drinking water while saving up to 50% of water typically used by agriculture.

There have also been proposals to create buffer zones of foliage and wetlands to help filter out the phosphorus before it reaches water. Other experts have suggested using conservation tillage, changing crop rotations, and restoring wetlands. It is possible for some dead zones to shrink within a year under proper management.

There have been a few success stories in controlling chemicals. After Norway's lobster fishery collapsed in 1986 due to low oxygen levels, for instance, the government in neighboring Denmark took action and reduced phosphorus output by 80 percent which brought oxygen levels closer to normal. Similarly, dead zones in the Black Sea and along the Danube River recovered after phosphorus applications by farmers were reduced by 60%.

Nutrients can be permanently removed from wetlands harvesting wetland plants, reducing nutrient influx into surrounding bodies of water. Research is ongoing to determine the efficacy of floating mats of cattails in removing nutrients from surface waters too deep to sustain the growth of wetland plants.

In the U.S., surface runoff is the largest source of nutrients added to rivers and lakes, but is mostly unregulated under the federal Clean Water Act. Locally developed initiatives to reduce nutrient pollution are underway in various areas of the country, such as the Great Lakes region and the Chesapeake Bay. To help reduce algal blooms in Lake Erie, the State of Ohio presented a plan in 2016 to reduce phosphorus runoff.

=== Chemical treatment ===
Although a number of algaecides have been effective in killing algae, they have been used mostly in small bodies of water. For large algal blooms, however, adding algaecides such as silver nitrate or copper sulfate can have worse effects, such as killing fish outright and harming other wildlife. Cyanobacteria can also develop resistance to copper-containing algaecides, requiring a larger quantity of the chemical to be effective for HAB management, but introducing a greater risk to other species in the region. The negative effects can therefore be worse than letting the algae die off naturally.

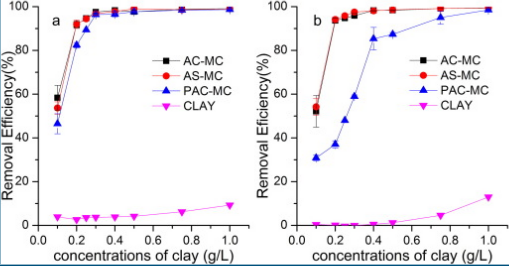
The left graph shows the efficacy of aluminum chloride modified clay (AC-MC), aluminum sulfide modified clay (AS-MC), polyaluminum modified clay (PAC-MC) and standard untreated clay in deionized water for removing Aureococcus anophagefferens, a bloom causing algae. The right graph shows the same clays tested in seawater.

In 2019, Chippewa Lake in Northeast Ohio became the first lake in the U.S. to successfully test a new chemical treatment. The chemical formula killed all of the toxic algae in the lake within a single day. The formula has already been used in China, South Africa and Israel.

In February 2020, Roodeplaat Dam in Gauteng Province, South Africa was treated with a new algicide formulation against a severe bloom of Microcystis sp. This formulation allows the granular product to float and slow-release its active ingredient, sodium percarbonate, that releases hydrogen peroxide (H_{2}O_{2}), on the water surface. Consequently, the effective concentrations are limited, vertically, to the surface of the water; and spatially to areas where cyanobacteria are abundant. This provide the aquatic organisms a "safe haven" in untreated areas and avoids the adverse effects associated with the use of standard algicides.

Bioactive compounds isolated from terrestrial and aquatic plants, particularly seaweeds, have seen results as a more environmentally friendly control for HABs. Molecules found in seaweeds such as Corallina, Sargassum, and Saccharina japonica have shown to inhibit some bloom-forming microalgae. In addition to their anti-microalgal effects, the bioactive molecules found in these seaweeds also have antibacterial, antifungal, and antioxidant properties.

==== Removal of HABs using aluminum-modified clay ====
Another method of HAB control is treatment with modified clays. Clay flocculation treats HAB events by ‘removing’ algal cells from the water. During treatment, clay is released onto the surface of the water and begins to sink. As the clay particles sink, properties on their surface help them stick to, or flocculate with, algal bloom cells and each other. These groups of particles and cells, or flocs, sink to the bottom of the water body. This process, from flocculation to sinking into deeper and darker waters to burial under sediment, can kill algal cells and slow a bloom event.

Different clays have different charges and properties, which influence their ability to ‘stick to’ algal cells. By altering the surface of the clay, we can increase its efficiency in the removal of HAB cells from a body of water. This helps us use less clay in bloom treatment. Modified clays, such as aluminium chloride modified clay (AC-MC), aluminum sulfide modified clay (AS-MC) and polyaluminium chloride modified clay (PAC-MC) have shown positive results in vitro for the removal of Aureococcus by trapping the microalgae in the sediment of clay, removing it from the top layer of water where harmful blooms can occur. Similarly, polymer polyaluminum chloride (PAC) adds a positive charge to clay that helps it attract negatively-charged red tide cells. This allows the clay to attract and remove red tide cells and toxins more efficiently.

Modified clay treatment is largely used in South Korea and China to treat algal blooms, and studies are currently underway to see if it can also be used to treat red tide in Florida. While some concerns exist about the environmental impacts of modified clay treatment, many current studies have found it to be effective in treating HABs without significant negative impacts on the surrounding ecosystem. For example, an early study by Shumway et al. 2003 reported a negative effect of “yellow loess”, the modified clay used in South Korea for HAB treatment, on filter feeding invertebrates. However, later studies did not find significant negative effects on natural organisms at a dosage used for treating HABs. Studies, moreover, found that modified clay could help limit exposure of benthic organisms, or organisms that live near the bottom of the water body, to toxic algal cells and their toxins. As such, studies into the use of clay to control HAB's have proven that this method may be an effective way to reduce the negative effects caused by HABs.

==== Removal of HABs using a hydrodynamic separator ====
In the Netherlands, successful algae and phosphate removal from surface water has been obtained by pumping affected water through a hydrodynamic separator. The treated water is then free from algae and contains a significant lower amount of phosphate since the removed algae cells contain a lot of phosphate. The treated water also gets a lower turbidity. Future projects will study the positive effects on the ecology and marine life as it is expected plant life will be restored and a reduction in bottom dwelling fish will automatically reduce the turbidity of the cleaned water. The removed algae and phosphate may find its way not as waste but as infeed to bio digesters.

=== Additional reservoirs ===
Other experts have proposed building reservoirs to prevent the movement of algae downstream. However, that can lead to the growth of algae within the reservoir, which become sediment traps with a resultant buildup of nutrients. Some researchers found that intensive blooms in reservoirs were the primary source of toxic algae observed downstream, but the movement of algae has so far been less studied, although it is considered a likely cause of algae transport.

=== Restoring shellfish populations ===
The decline of filter-feeding shellfish populations, such as oysters, likely contribute to HAB occurrence. As such, numerous research projects are assessing the potential of restored shellfish populations to reduce HAB occurrence.

=== Improved monitoring ===
Algal blooms forming and breaking up over time

Other remedies include using improved monitoring methods, trying to improve predictability, and testing new potential methods of controlling HABs. Some countries surrounding the Baltic Sea, which has the world's largest dead zone, have considered using massive geoengineering options, such as forcing air into bottom layers to aerate them.

Mathematical models are useful to predict future algal blooms.

==== Sensors and monitoring devices ====
Predicting harmful algal blooms is a public health concern. Sophisticated sensors can help warn about potential blooms. Sensors can be used by water treatment facilities to help them prepare for higher algae levels.

The only sensors now in use are located in the Gulf of Mexico. In 2008 similar sensors in the Gulf forewarned of an increased level of toxins that led to a shutdown of shellfish harvesting in Texas along with a recall of mussels, clams, and oysters, possibly saving many lives. With an increase in the size and frequency of HABs, experts state the need for significantly more sensors located around the country. The same kinds of sensors can also be used to detect threats to drinking water from intentional contamination.

Satellite and remote sensing technologies are growing in importance for monitoring, tracking, and detecting HABs. Four U.S. federal agencies—EPA, the National Aeronautics and Space Administration (NASA), NOAA, and the U.S. Geological Survey (USGS)—are working on ways to detect and measure cyanobacteria blooms using satellite data. The data may help develop early-warning indicators of cyanobacteria blooms by monitoring both local and national coverage. In 2016 automated early-warning monitoring systems were successfully tested, and for the first time proven to identify the rapid growth of algae and the subsequent depletion of oxygen in the water.

== Notable occurrences ==
=== Timeline ===
- 1530: First alleged case off the Florida Gulf Coast is without foundation. According to Marine Lab at University of Miami, the first possible Red Tide in Florida was in 1844. Earlier "signs" were from boats sorting fish on their way to home port dumping trash fish overboard. Thus "dead fish" reports along the coast were not Red Tide.
- 1793: The first recorded case occurring in British Columbia, Canada.
- 1840: No deaths of humans have been attributed to Florida red tide, but people may experience respiratory irritation (coughing, sneezing, and tearing) when the red tide organism (Karenia brevis) is present along a coast and winds blow its aerosolized toxins. Swimming is usually safe, but skin irritation and burning is possible in areas of high concentration of red tide.
- 1844: First possible case off the Florida Gulf Coast according to Marine Lab University of Miami, probably by ships off shore, no known inhabitants of the coast reporting.
- 1901: Lingulodinium polyedrum produces brilliant displays of bioluminescence in warm coastal waters. Seen in Southern California regularly since at least 1901.
- 1916: Massive fish kill along SW Florida coast. Noxious air thought to be seismic underwater explosion releasing chlorine gas.
- 1947: Southwest Florida: A massive bloom that lasts close a year almost destroys the commercial fishing industry and sponge beds. The resulting poisoned surf caused beaches to need to be evacuated.
- 1972: A red tide was caused in New England by a toxic dinoflagellate Alexandrium (Gonyaulax) tamarense. The red tides caused by the dinoflagellate Gonyaulax are serious because this organism produces saxitoxin and gonyautoxins which accumulate in shellfish and if ingested may lead to paralytic shellfish poisoning (PSP) and can lead to death.
- 1972 and 1973: Red tides killed two villagers west of Port Moresby. In March 1973 a red tide invaded Port Moresby Harbour and destroyed a Japanese pearl farm.
- In 1972, a red tide was caused in New England by a toxic dinoflagellate Alexandrium (Gonyaulax) tamarense.
- 1976: The first PSP case in Sabah, Malaysian Borneo where 202 victims were reported to be suffering and 7 deaths.
- 1987: A red algae bloom in Prince Edward Island caused over a million dollars in losses.
- 1991: The largest algal bloom on record was the 1991 Darling River cyanobacterial bloom in Australia, largely of Anabaena circinalis, between October and December 1991 over 1,000 kilometres (620 mi) of the Barwon and Darling Rivers.
- 2005: The Canadian red tide was discovered to have come further south than it has in years prior by the ship (R/V) Oceanus, closing shellfish beds in Maine and Massachusetts and alerting authorities as far south as Montauk (Long Island, NY) to check their beds. Experts who discovered the reproductive cysts in the seabed warn of a possible spread to Long Island in the future, halting the area's fishing and shellfish industry and threatening the tourist trade, which constitutes a significant portion of the island's economy.
- In 2008 large blooms of the algae Cochlodinium polykrikoid were found along the Chesapeake Bay and nearby tributaries such as the James River, causing millions of dollars in damage and numerous beach closures.
- In 2009, Brittany, France experienced recurring macroalgal blooms caused by the high amount of fertilizer discharging in the sea due to intensive pig farming, causing lethal gas emissions that have led to one case of human unconsciousness and three animal deaths.
- In 2010, dissolved iron in the ash from the Eyjafjallajökull volcano triggered a plankton bloom in the North Atlantic.
- 2011: Northern California
- 2011: Gulf of Mexico
- In 2013, an algal bloom was caused in Qingdao, China, by sea lettuce.
- 2013: In January, a red tide occurred again on the West Coast Sea of Sabah in the Malaysian Borneo. Two human fatalities were reported after they consumed shellfish contaminated with the red tide toxin.
- 2013: In January, a red tide bloom appeared at Sarasota beach – mainly Siesta Key, Florida causing a fish kill that had a negative impact on tourists, and caused respiratory issues for beach-goers.
- In 2014, Myrionecta rubra (previously known as Mesodinium rubrum), a ciliate protist that ingests cryptomonad algae, caused a bloom in southeastern coast of Brazil.
- In 2014, blue green algae caused a bloom in the western basin of Lake Erie, poisoning the Toledo, Ohio water system connected to 500,000 people.
- 2014: In August, massive 'Florida red tide' 90 miles (140 km) long and 60 miles (97 km) wide.
- 2015: June, 12 persons hospitalized in the Philippine province of Bohol for red tide poisoning.
- 2015: August, several beaches in the Netherlands between Katwijk and Scheveningen were plagued. Government institutions dissuaded swimmers from entering the water.
- 2015: September, a red tide bloom occurred in the Gulf of Mexico, affecting Padre Island National Seashore along North Padre Island and South Padre Island in Texas.
- 2017 and 2018: K. brevis red tide algae with warnings not to swim, state of emergency declared, dead dolphin and manatee, worsened by Caloosahatchee River. Peaked in the summer of 2018. Toxic harmful algae bloom red tide in Southwest Florida. A rare harmful algal bloom along Florida's east coast of Palm Beach County occurred the weekend of 30 September 2018.
- In 2019, blue-green algae, or Cyanobacteria blooms, were again problematic on Lake Erie. In early August 2019, satellite images depicted a bloom stretching up to 1,300 square kilometers, with the epicentre near Toledo, Ohio. The largest Lake Erie bloom to date occurred in 2015, exceeding the severity index at 10.5 and in 2011 at a 10. A large bloom does not necessarily mean the cyanobacteria ... will produce toxins", said Michael McKay, of the University of Windsor. Water quality testing was underway in August.
- In 2019, a bloom of Noctiluca algae caused bioluminescent glow off the coast of Chennai, India. Similar blooms have been reported annually in the northern Arabian Sea since the early 2000s.
- 2021: In July, a large red tide occurred on the Gulf Coast of Florida in and around Tampa Bay. The event has caused the death of millions of pounds of fish, and led to the National Weather Service declaring a Beach Hazard.
- 2021: in October, the mass deaths of shellfish (specifically crabs and lobster) on the beaches of Northern England, led to and algal bloom being blamed as the cause by the UK Government. However, those who work in the fishing industry in the area, and some academics, have stated that pyridine poisoning is the cause.
- 2023: A blue-green algae bloom occurred in Lough Neagh, Northern Ireland, the largest fresh water lake in the UK and Ireland where 40% of Northern Ireland gets its tap water from. It is caused by Northern Ireland experiencing both the wettest and hottest summer on record making conditions perfect for blue-green algae. Poor management of the Lough is being blamed. The bloom has killed dogs and wildlife, including swans.
- 2025: In March 2025, an algal bloom composed of Karenia mikimotoi and four other species started affecting a long stretch of coast in South Australia. The bloom has persisted until November 2025, with preliminary research showing that Karenia cristata may be the chief source of the brevetoxins produced by the bloom.

=== North America ===
Alexandrium monilatum is found in subtropical or tropical shallow seas and estuaries in the western Atlantic Ocean, the Caribbean Sea, the Gulf of Mexico, and the eastern Pacific Ocean.

There was increased research activity of harmful algae blooms (HABs) in the 1980s and 1990s. This was primarily driven by media attention from the discovery of new HAB organisms and the potential adverse health effects of their exposure to animals and humans. Major advances have occurred in the study of dinoflagellates and their genomics. Some include identification of the toxin-producing genes (PKS genes), exploration of environmental changes (temperature, light/dark, etc.) have on gene expression, as well as an appreciation of the complexity of the Karenia genome.

==== Florida and Gulf of Mexico ====
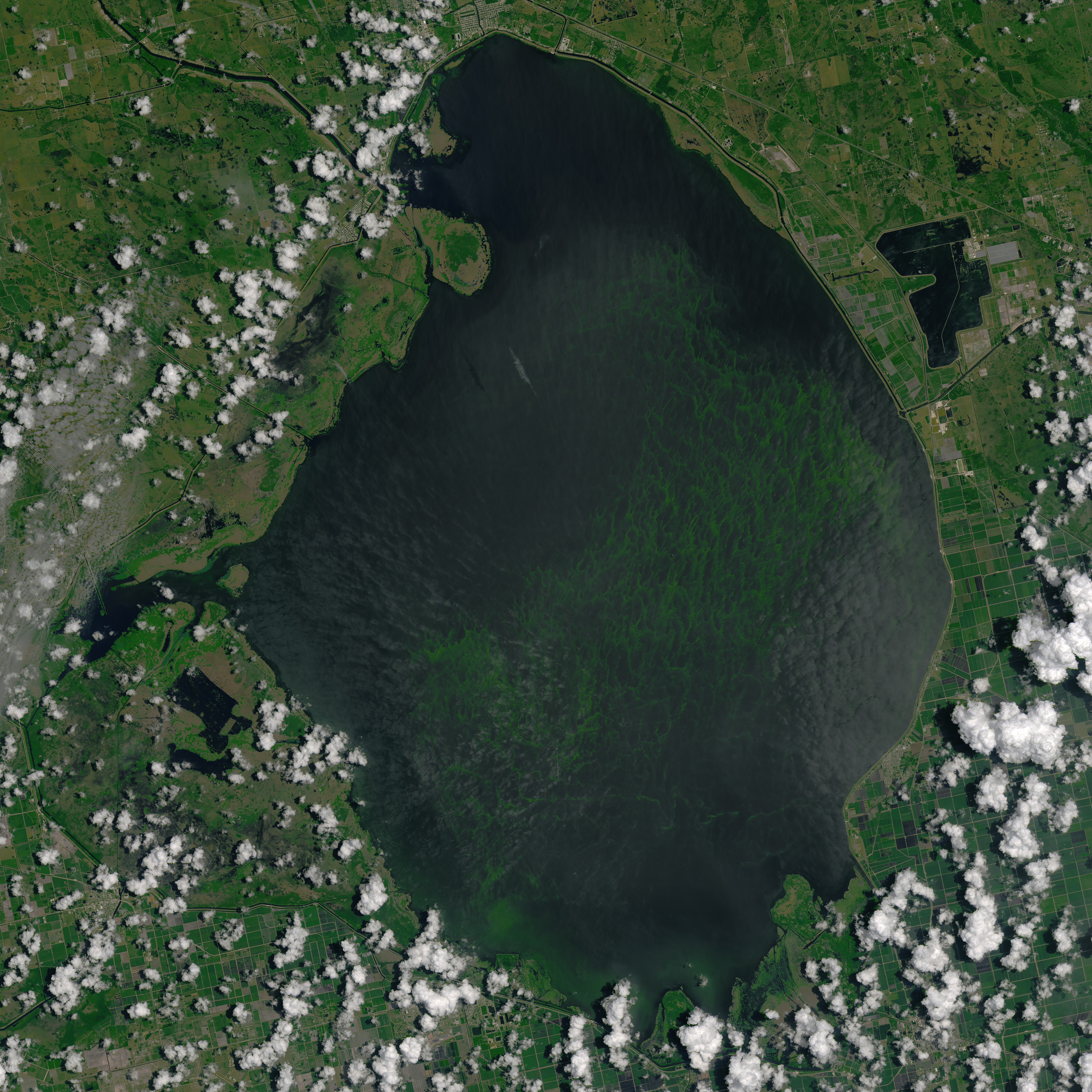
Harmful algal bloom (cyanobacteria) on Lake Okeechobee in 2016

Lake Okeechobee is an ideal habitat for cyanobacteria because its shallow, sunny, and laden with nutrients from Florida's agriculture. The Okeechobee Waterway connects the lake to the Atlantic Ocean and the Gulf of Mexico through the St. Lucie River and the Caloosahatchee respectively. This means that harmful algal blooms are carried down the estuaries as water is released during the wet summer months. In July 2018 up to 90% of Lake Okeechobee was covered in algae. Water draining from the lake filled the region with a noxious odor and caused respiratory problems in some humans during the following month.

Harmful red tide blooms are historically common on the coasts of Florida coasts and elsewhere around the Gulf of Mexico during these same summer months. These blooms have been documented since the 1800s, and occur almost annually along Florida's coasts. Cyanobacteria in the rivers die as they reach saltwater but their nitrogen fixation feeds the red tide on the coast. Areas at the mouth of the estuaries such as Cape Coral and Port St. Lucie therefore experience the compounded effects of both types of harmful algal bloom. Cleanup crews hired by authorities in Lee County - where the Caloosahatchee meets the Gulf of Mexico - removed more than 1700 tons of dead marine life in August 2018. The well-known "Florida red tide" that occurs in the Gulf of Mexico is a HAB caused by Karenia brevis, a dinoflagellate which produces brevetoxin, the neurotoxin responsible for neurotoxic shellfish poisoning. The Florida red tides have been observed to have spread as far as the eastern coast of Mexico. The density of these organisms during a bloom can exceed tens of millions of cells per litre of seawater, and often discolor the water a deep reddish-brown hue.

In July 2016 Florida declared a state of emergency for four counties as a result of blooms. They were said to be "destroying" a number of businesses and affecting local economies, with many needing to shut down entirely. Some beaches were closed, and hotels and restaurants suffered a drop in business. Tourist sporting activities such as fishing and boating were also affected.

In 2019, the biggest Sargassum bloom ever seen created a crisis in the Tourism industry in North America. This event was likely caused by climate change and nutrient pollution from fertilizers. Several Caribbean countries considered declaring a state of emergency due to the impact on tourism as a result of environmental damage and potentially toxic and harmful health effects.

==== Other locations ====
Red tide is also sometimes used to describe harmful algal blooms on the northeast coast of the United States, particularly in the Gulf of Maine. This type of bloom is caused by another species of dinoflagellate known as Alexandrium fundyense. These blooms of organisms cause severe disruptions in fisheries of these waters, as the toxins in these organism cause filter-feeding shellfish in affected waters to become poisonous for human consumption due to saxitoxin.

California coastal waters also experience seasonal blooms of Pseudo-nitzschia, a diatom known to produce domoic acid, the neurotoxin responsible for amnesic shellfish poisoning.

Natural water reservoirs in Texas have been threatened by anthropogenic activities due to large petroleum refineries and oil wells (i.e. emission and wastewater discharge), massive agricultural activities (i.e. pesticide release) and mining extractions (i.e. toxic wastewater) as well as natural phenomena involving frequent HAB events. For the first time in 1985, the state of Texas documented the presence of the P. parvum (golden alga) bloom along the Pecos River. This phenomenon has affected 33 reservoirs in Texas along major river systems, including the Brazos, Canadian, Rio Grande, Colorado, and Red River, and has resulted in the death of more than 27 million fish and caused tens of millions of dollars in damage.

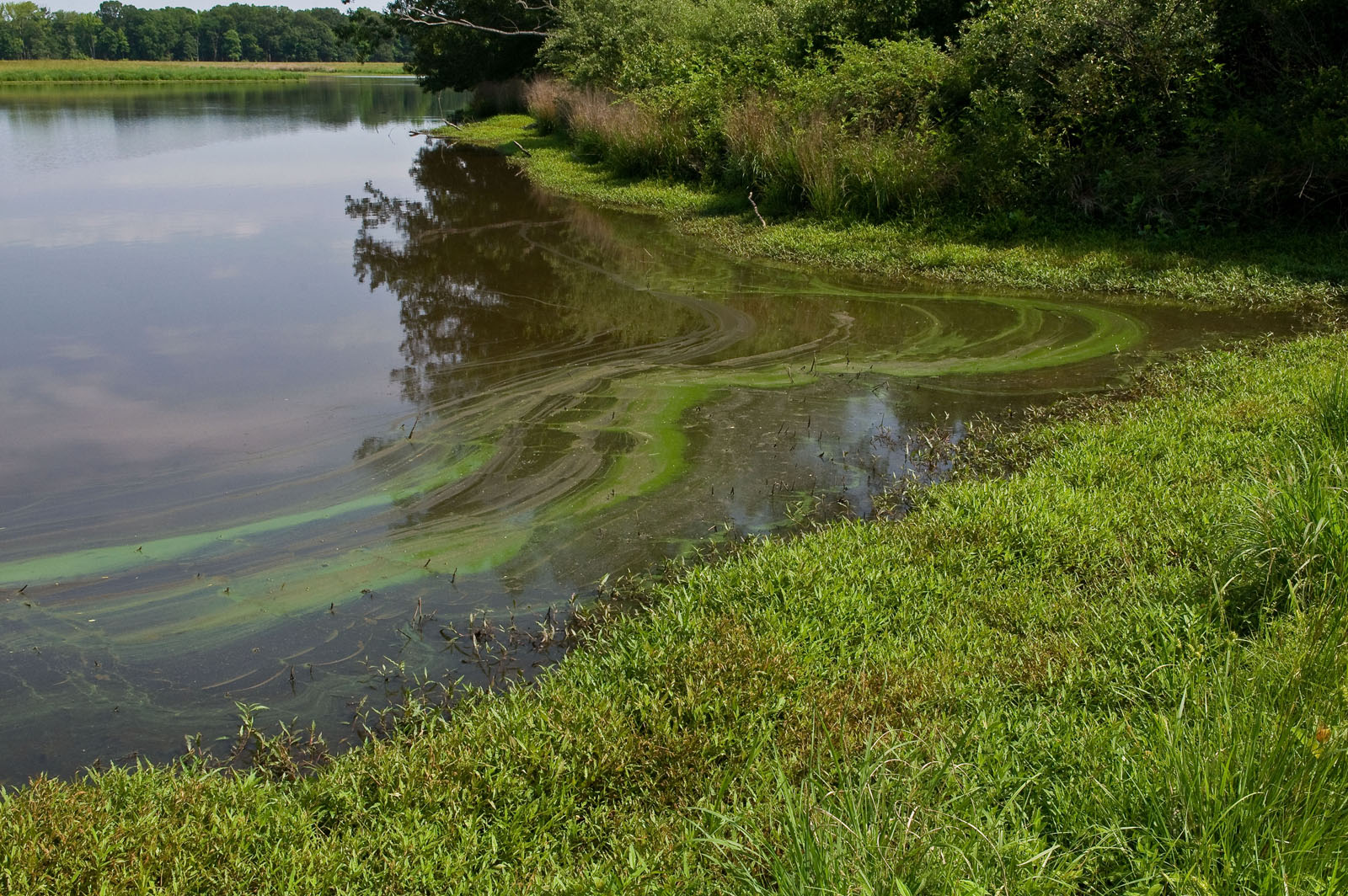
An algal bloom on the Sassafras River, a tributary of the Chesapeake Bay, U.S.

The Chesapeake Bay, in Maryland and Virginia, is the largest estuary in the U.S. It has suffered from repeated large algal blooms for decades due to chemical runoff from multiple sources, including 9 large rivers and 141 smaller streams and creeks in parts of six states. In addition, the water is quite shallow and only 1% of the waste entering it gets flushed into the ocean. By weight, 60% of the phosphates entering the bay in 2003 were from sewage treatment plants, while 60% of its nitrates came from fertilizer runoff, farm animal waste, and the atmosphere. About 300 million pounds (140 Gg) of nitrates are added to the bay each year. The population increase in the bay watershed, from 3.7 million people in 1940 to 18 million in 2015 is also a major factor, as economic growth leads to the increased use of fertilizers and rising emissions of industrial waste. As of 2015, the six states and the local governments in the Chesapeake watershed had upgraded their sewage treatment plants to control nutrient discharges. The U.S. Environmental Protection Agency estimated that sewage treatment plant improvements in the Chesapeake region between 1985 and 2015 prevented the discharge of 900 million pounds (410 Gg) of nutrients, with nitrogen discharges reduced by 57% and phosphorus by 75%. Agricultural and urban runoff pollution continue to be major sources of nutrients in the bay, and efforts to manage those problems are continuing throughout the 64,000 square miles (170,000 km^{2}) watershed.

Algal blooms in Lake Erie fed primarily by agricultural runoff and led to warnings for some people in Canada and Ohio not to drink their water in 2014. The International Joint Commission has called on United States and Canada to drastically reduce phosphorus loads into Lake Erie to address the threat.

As of 2013, Green Bay in Lake Michigan had a dead zone caused by phosphorus pollution.

=== Europe ===
In 2020, a large harmful algal bloom closed beaches along the Baltic Sea coasts in Poland and Finland, brought on by a combination of fertilizer runoff and extreme heat, posing a risk to flounder and mussel beds. This is seen by the Baltic Sea Action Group as a threat to biodiversity and regional fishing stocks.

=== South Asia ===
Open defecation is common in south Asia, but human waste is an often overlooked source of nutrient pollution in marine pollution modeling. When nitrogen (N) and phosphorus (P) contributed by human waste was included in models for Bangladesh, India, and Pakistan, the estimated N and P inputs to bodies of water increased one to two orders of magnitude compared to previous models. River export of nutrients to coastal seas increases coastal eutrophication potential (ICEP). The ICEP of the Godavari River is three times higher when N and P inputs from human waste are included.

== See also ==
- Ciguatera
- Cyanobacterial bloom
- Cyanotoxin
- GEOHAB - an international research programme on the Global Ecology and Oceanography of Harmful algal blooms
- Pfiesteria
- Thin layers (oceanography)
- Water quality
- Water security
