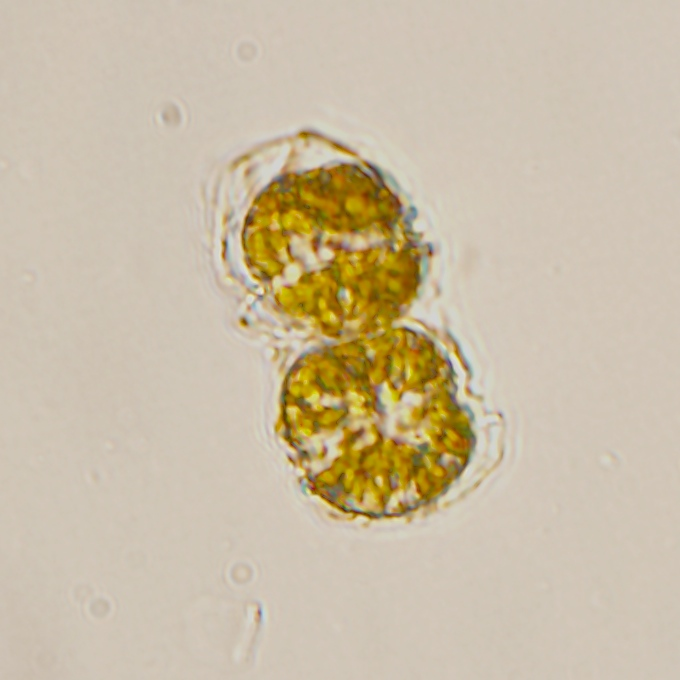

Scientific classification
- Domain: Eukaryota
- Clade: Sar
- Clade: Alveolata
- Phylum: Dinoflagellata
- Class: Dinophyceae
- Order: Gonyaulacales
- Family: Ostreopsidaceae
- Genus: Alexandrium
- Species: A. catenella

Binomial name
- Alexandrium catenella (Whedon & Kofoid) Balech

= Alexandrium catenella =

Species of single-celled organism

Alexandrium catenella is a species of dinoflagellates. It is among the group of Alexandrium species that produce toxins that cause paralytic shellfish poisoning, and is a cause of red tide. Alexandrium catenella is observed in cold, coastal waters, generally at temperate latitudes. These organisms have been found in the west coast of North America, Japan, Australia, and parts of South Africa.

Alexandrium catenella can occur in single cells (similar to A. fundyense), but more often they are seen in short chains of 2, 4, or 8 cells. The organism is typically 20–25 μm in length and 25–32 μm in width. The cells are compressed both in the anterior and posterior ends of this specimen. Alexandrium has two flagella that enable it to swim. While one flagellum encircles the cell causing the cell the rotate and move forward, the other extends behind the cell and controls the direction. In some instances, these organisms can appear like small trains moving in the water under a microscope.

Alexandrium catenella spends the majority of its life in a resting cyst state, in which it cycles between dormancy and quiescence in benthic accumulations called cyst beds, which can act as seed banks for future blooms. Resting cysts are colorless and ellipsoid in shape, ranging between 38 and 56 um long, and 23-32 um wide, and are difficult to distinguish from the cysts of Alexandrium tamarense. The resting cysts germinate once environmental conditions, mainly sustained warmer temperatures, are favorable, and will produce motile cells capable of photosynthesis and asexual reproduction, which form the blooms associated with paralytic shellfish poisoning (PSP).

The dinoflagellate produces saxitoxin, which is a highly potent neurotoxin. If consumed, this toxin can cause paralytic shellfish poisoning (PSP). By ingesting saxitoxin, humans can suffer from numbness, ataxia, incoherence, and in extreme cases respiratory paralysis and death. The toxin was discovered in 1927 in central California. Shellfish poisoning affected over a hundred humans, and now saxitoxin is recognized as one of the most deadly algal toxins.

These algal blooms have caused severe disruptions in the fisheries of these waters, and have caused filter-feeding shellfish in affected waters to become poisonous for human consumption. Because of this, A. catenella is categorized as a harmful algal bloom (HAB) species. While in some areas the causes of HABs appears to be completely natural, in others, they appear to be a result of human activity, which is often coastal water pollution and over-fertilization.

Alexandrium catenella's multiplication is stimulated by higher ammonia and inorganic nitrogen concentrations. The optimal growth conditions for A. catenella include a cool temperature of around 17 to 23 °C, a medium to light illumination of 3500 to 4000 lux, and a high salinity of around 26 to 32 percent.

== See also ==
- Red tide crisis in Chiloé
