= Alathyria condola =

Scientific classification
- Kingdom: Animalia
- Phylum: Mollusca
- Class: Bivalvia
- Order: Unionida
- Family: Hyriidae
- Genus: Alathyria
- Species: A. condola

Binomial name
- Alathyria condola Iredale, 1943

Species of bivalve

Alathyria condola, also known as the condolar river mussel, is a species of freshwater bivalve in the family Hyriidae. This species occurs in the Lachlan and Murrumbidgee River systems in eastern New South Wales, Australia. The type specimen was collected from the Murrumbidgee River.

The mussel is susceptible to bioaccumulation of hazardous levels of toxins from the cyanobacterium Anabaena circinalis which can lead to paralytic shellfish poisoning when eaten.
