= Red tide crisis in Chiloé =

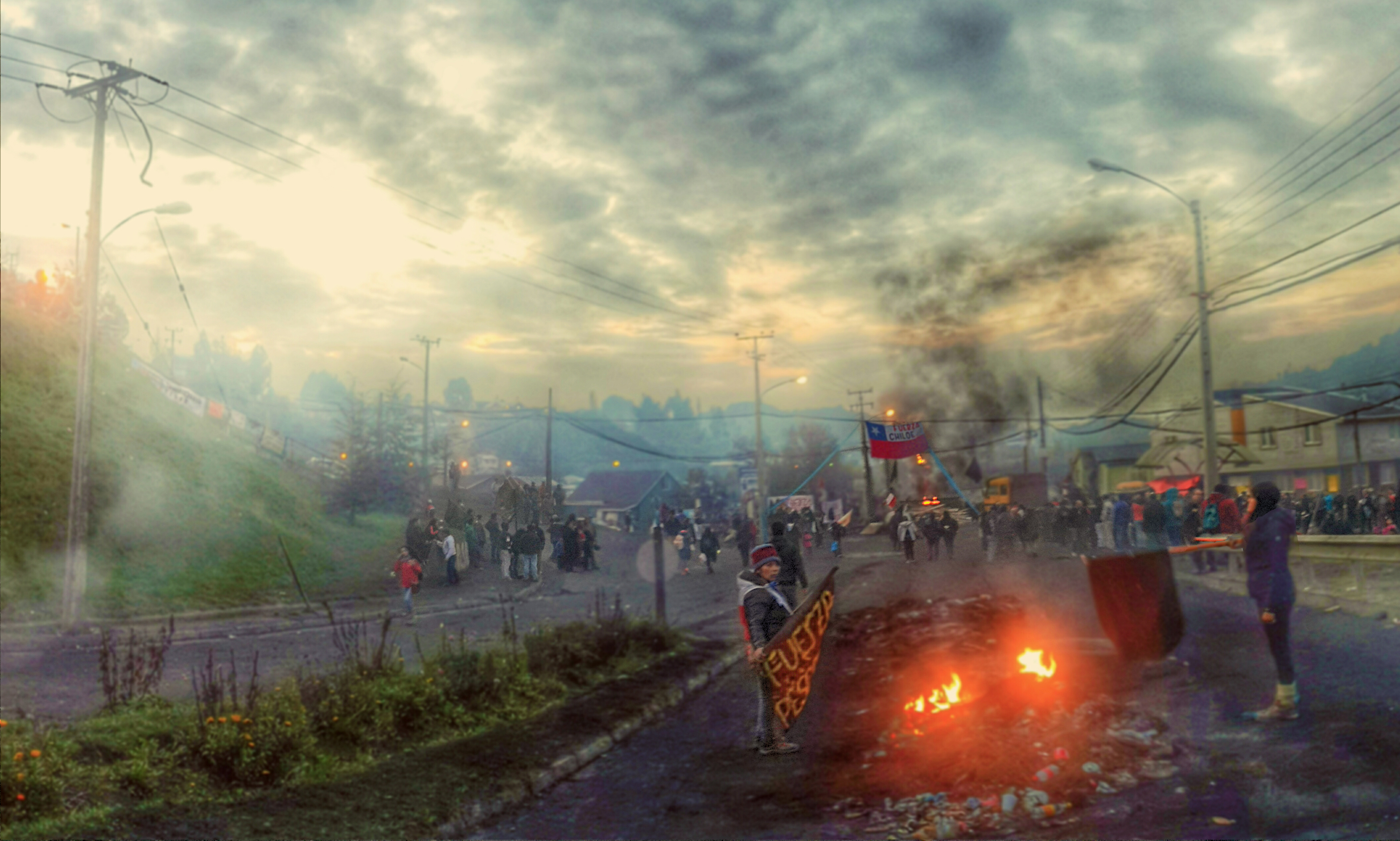
Stylized photograph of a barricade on May 6, 2016 just north of Castro.

The red tide crisis in Chiloé, also known as "Chilote May" (Spanish: Mayo chilote), was a social, economic and environmental catastrophe that occurred in the Chiloé Archipelago, southern Chile, in the southern autumn of 2016, as a result of a severe algal bloom of the dinoflagellate Alexandrium catenella — a microalgae responsible for the phenomenon known as red tide. The bloom spanned the months of March and April and affected the outer sea of the Los Lagos Region, the inland coast of Chiloé, and the Chacao Channel. It affected thousands of artisanal fishermen on the Chiloé Island —in addition to other communes such as Calbuco, Maullín and Puerto Montt (the regional capital) because they were prohibited from extracting marine resources due to widespread contamination with paralytic shellfish poison (PSP).

The severe economic effects and the poor response provided by the administration of Michelle Bachelet —as well as the controversial dumping of more than 4,700 tons of decomposing salmon off the coast of Chiloé, carried out in March by the salmon industry with the authorization of the Government—provoked a social mobilization unprecedented in the history of Chiloé, which, by blocking routes and maritime access to the island, kept the archipelago paralyzed and isolated from the mainland for eighteen days —between the 2nd and the 19th of may-. The blockades and protests would end after all the mobilized communes reached agreements with the Government on economic aid, but the ban on extracting resources would remain in place for several months in various areas of the region, due to the presence of toxins.

The crisis generated harsh questions about the role of the Government during the emergency, as well as the salmon industry for its role in the emergency and the alleged impact of its operation on the environment.

== Link between Salmon dumping and the red tide crisis ==
The red tide crisis in Chiloé devastated marine ecosystems and the livelihoods of local fishermen. While factors like the 2015-2016 El Niño event contributed, many blame the Chilean salmon industry for exacerbating the crisis. The industry dumped 4,700 tons of dead salmon into the northern Sea of Chiloé after a previous brown tide outbreak of Pseudochattonella verruculosa. Though typically non-toxic, brown tides can deplete oxygen and block sunlight, weakening ecosystems and increasing the risk of toxic algal blooms. In Chiloé, the combination of the brown tide, poor aquaculture waste management, and El Niño created the perfect storm for an environmental and economic disaster. Studies suggest that ocean currents likely carried the eutrophic waters from decomposing fish toward Chiloé’s shores, potentially intensifying the algal bloom during the second pulse of the red tide.

== Regulatory failures and environmental justice ==
Chile’s weak aquaculture regulations allowed the salmon industry to dispose of massive organic waste without assessing the environmental consequences. This neglect turned a manageable crisis into a long-term ecological and economic catastrophe. Addressing these injustices requires stricter policies on aquaculture waste disposal, more accountability for industry actors, government, and stronger protections for local fishing communities that depend on healthy marine ecosystems.

This disaster represents an environmental justice failure affecting both the ecosystem and the livelihoods of thousands. The toxic bloom shut down up to 500 km of shellfish harvesting, while 6,000 divers and fishermen lost their income, on top of 4,500 salmon industry workers already dismissed after the brown tide. The government’s slow response and lack of preventive measures left affected communities without support, prioritizing industrial profits over ecological and human well-being.
