= Shellfish poisoning =

- Specialty: Toxicology

Shellfish poisoning includes four syndromes that share some common features and are primarily associated with bivalve molluscs (such as mussels, clams, oysters and scallops). As filter feeders, these shellfish may accumulate toxins produced by microscopic organisms, such as cyanobacteria, diatoms and dinoflagellates.

== Syndromes ==
The syndromes are:

- Amnesic shellfish poisoning (ASP)
- Diarrheal shellfish poisoning (DSP)
- Neurotoxic shellfish poisoning (NSP)
- Paralytic shellfish poisoning (PSP)

== See also ==
- Cyanotoxin
- Gonyaulax
