= Paralytic shellfish poisoning =

Syndrome of shellfish poisoning

- The saxitoxin molecule shown in its neutral state

Paralytic shellfish poisoning (PSP) is one of the four recognized syndromes of shellfish poisoning, which share some common features and are primarily associated with bivalve mollusks (such as mussels, clams, oysters and scallops). These shellfish are filter feeders and accumulate neurotoxins, chiefly saxitoxin, produced by microscopic algae, such as dinoflagellates, diatoms, and cyanobacteria. Dinoflagellates of the genus Alexandrium are the most numerous and widespread saxitoxin producers and are responsible for PSP blooms in subarctic, temperate, and tropical locations. The majority of toxic blooms have been caused by the morphospecies Alexandrium catenella, Alexandrium tamarense, Gonyaulax catenella and Alexandrium fundyense, which together comprise the A. tamarense species complex. In Asia, PSP is mostly associated with the occurrence of the species Pyrodinium bahamense.

Some pufferfish, including the chamaeleon puffer, also contain saxitoxin, making their consumption hazardous.

== PSP and cyanobacteria ==
PSP toxins (of which saxitoxin is the most ubiquitous) are produced in eukaryotic dinoflagellates and prokaryotic cyanobacteria (usually referred to as blue-green algae). Within the freshwater marine ecosystem, the largest contribution in the accumulation of PSP toxins derives from saxitoxin produced by cyanobacteria. The biosynthesis of saxitoxin is well-defined in cyanobacteria, while within dinoflagellates it remains mostly unknown. Cyanobacterial saxitoxin biosynthesis has been studied in radioisotope tracing experiments, and turns out to be highly complex, involving many steps, enzymes and chemical reactions. The starting reagent, L-arginine, goes through several chemical reactions (among which is a rare chemical reaction known as a Claisen condensation), going through four intermediates before resulting in saxitoxin.

The Australian freshwater mussel Alathyria condola is highly susceptible to neurotoxin accumulation. After two to three days of exposure to the cyanobacterium Anabaena circinalis it may contain upwards of 80 micrograms of neurotoxins per 100 grams of mussel, a level high enough to cause significant health risks to humans.

== Pathophysiology ==
PSP affects those who come into contact with the affected shellfish by ingestion. The toxins responsible for most shellfish poisonings—mainly saxitoxin, although several other toxins have been found, such as neosaxitoxin and gonyautoxins I to IV—are water-insoluble, and heat- and acid-stable. Therefore, ordinary cooking methods will not eliminate the toxins.

Symptoms typically appear within ten to 30 minutes after ingestion, and may include nausea, vomiting, diarrhea, abdominal pain, and tingling or burning lips, gums, tongue, face, neck, arms, legs, and toes. Shortness of breath, dry mouth, a choking feeling, confused or slurred speech, and loss of coordination are also possible. PSP toxins, such as saxitoxin, are able to bind near the sodium ion channel, blocking passage of potassium and/or sodium into (and out of) the cell. This restricts (or outright prevents) transmission of signals between neurons. This can result in (partial or complete) paralysis. PSP can be fatal in extreme cases, particularly in immunocompromised individuals; children are known to be more susceptible.

Most shellfish can store saxitoxin for several weeks after a harmful algal bloom passes, but some, such as butter clams, can store the toxin for up to two years.

== PSP in wild marine mammals ==
PSP has been implicated as a possible cause of sea otter mortality and morbidity in Alaska, as one of its primary prey items, the butter clam (Saxidomus gigantea) bioaccumulates saxitoxin as a chemical defense mechanism. In addition, ingestion of saxitoxin-containing mackerel has been implicated in the death of humpback whales.

Additional cases where PSP was suspected as the cause of death in Mediterranean monk seals (Monachus monachus) in the Mediterranean Sea have been questioned due to lack of additional testing to rule out other causes of mortality.

== Detection and treatment ==
Several detection methods can be used in order to determine the concentration of saxitoxin within an organism (be it shellfish or human), both in vivo and in vitro. The most commonly used in vivo method is the mouse bioassay, which provides quantitative and qualitative data in case of a (suspected) PSP neurotoxin exposure; in vitro receptor binding assays provide equivalent data, while being animal-friendly. PSP neurotoxins can also be detected by high-performance liquid chromatography (HPLC), amongst other forms of chromatography. Shellfish containing 80 or more micrograms of saxitoxin per 100g of edible shellfish tissue are deemed to be unsafe for human consumption. Currently, there is no antidote for PSP neurotoxins. Most PSP patients suffer only minor symptoms, these lasting until the toxin is eliminated from the body. With minor exposure, spontaneous recovery can thus be expected. In the relatively rare case of clinically significant respiratory paralysis, symptomatic treatment in the form of oxygen supplementation and/or mechanical ventilation should be employed until symptoms subside.

== See also ==
- Amnesic shellfish poisoning
- Diarrheal shellfish poisoning
- Neurotoxic shellfish poisoning
- Harmful algal blooms (see "toxins")
- Ciguatera
- Fugu
- Cyanotoxin
- Dinoflagellate ecology and physiology (see "neurotoxins", "red tide", and "phosphate")
- Red tide crisis in Chiloé
