= Gonyaulax =

Scientific classification
- Domain: Eukaryota
- Clade: Diaphoretickes
- Clade: SAR
- Clade: Alveolata
- Phylum: Myzozoa
- Superclass: Dinoflagellata
- Class: Dinophyceae
- Order: Gonyaulacales
- Family: Gonyaulacaceae
- Genus: Gonyaulax; Diesing, 1866

Species
- Gonyaulax spinifera; Gonyaulax apiculata; Gonyaulax polygramma Stein 1833; Gonyaulax fragilis (Schütt) Kofoid 1911; Gonyaulax ellegaardiae Mertens 2015

Genus of single-celled organisms

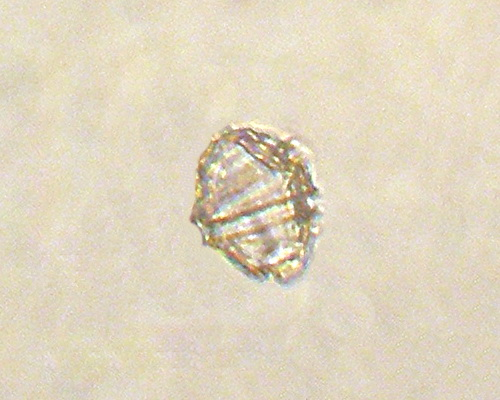
Gonyaulax spinifera

Gonyaulax is a genus of dinoflagellates with the type species Gonyaulax spinifera (Claparède et Lachmann) Diesing. Gonyaulax belongs to red dinoflagellates and commonly causes red tides. It can produce yesotoxins: for example, strains of Gonyaulax spinifera from New Zealand are yessotoxin producers.

== Structure ==
The plate formula in the genus Gonyaulax Diesing was redefined as Po, 3', 2a, 6", 6c, 4-8s, 5'", 1p, 1"".

== Classification ==
All species are marine, except for one freshwater species, Gonyaulax apiculata.

It previously included several species, which are now considered to belong to a separate genus, e.g.:

- Gonyaulax tamarensis (now: Alexandrium tamarense)
- Gonyaulax grindleyi (now: Protoceratium reticulatum)
- Gonyaulax polyedra (now: Lingulodinium polyedra)

== Adaptations ==
Gonyaulax dinoflagellates can produce resting cysts that belong to the cyst-defined genus Spiniferites and other genera

== Effect on humans ==
Although some Gonyaulax species can produce yessotoxins, which can accumulate in shellfish, no harmful effects to humans have been clearly demonstrated; however abalone mortalities have been related to blooms of Gonyaulax membranaceae.

== Red tide ==
A Red tide is a discoloration of the sea water by pigmented cells like Gonyaulax spp., some of which may produce toxins. Gonyaulax spinifera has been connected to the production of yessotoxins (YTXs), a group of structurally related polyether toxins, which can accumulate in shellfish.
