= Alexandrium fundyense =

Scientific classification
- Domain: Eukaryota
- Clade: Sar
- Clade: Alveolata
- Phylum: Dinoflagellata
- Class: Dinophyceae
- Order: Gonyaulacales
- Family: Ostreopsidaceae
- Genus: Alexandrium
- Species: A. fundyense

Binomial name
- Alexandrium fundyense Balech, 1985

Species of single-celled organism

Alexandrium fundyense is a species of dinoflagellate. It produces toxins that induce paralytic shellfish poisoning (PSP), and is a common cause of red tide. A. fundyense regularly forms massive blooms along the northeastern coasts of the United States and Canada, resulting in enormous economic losses and public health concerns.

Enzyme electrophoretic data and RNA genetic analysis show Alexandrium fundyense and A. tamarense to be closely related, while mating compatibilities even suggest them to be varieties of a single heterothallic species.

Recent molecular work shows that this species belongs to the Alexandrium tamarense complex (Atama complex, including A. tamarense, Alexandrium fundyense, Alexandrium catenella) and that none of the three original morphospecies designations forms monophyletic groups in the present SSUbased and previous LSU-based phylogenetic trees, i.e. these species designations are invalid. This currently needs further investigation.

Formation of dinocysts was observed in grazing experiments with oysters. The cyst dynamics of this species have been studied in the Gulf of Maine. Genetic studies of bloom development of this species show rapid selection occurring at a timescale of a few weeks.

== See also ==
- Harmful algal blooms
- Paralytic shellfish poisoning
- Saxitoxin
