= Baltic Sea Action Group =

The Baltic Sea Action Group (BSAG) is an independent non-profit foundation based in Finland. Formed in 2008, it seeks to restore the Baltic Sea, one of the most polluted seas in the world.

The BSAG aims to mitigate eutrophication and the effects of climate change, and to combat marine biodiversity loss. Additionally, the foundation promotes responsible shipping, and encourages regenerative agriculture in the Baltic Sea.

Cooperation with scientists, legislators, and farmers is important to the foundation’s approach. The BSAG also works with companies operating in and around the Baltic Sea, encouraging them to make Baltic Sea Commitments, i.e., promises to implement sustainability strategies. For example, in 2009, the foundation pushed Finnish chemical company Kemira to pledge to control their sludge disposal, in order to prevent high levels of nitrogen and phosphorus in waterways, therefore decreasing the risk of eutrophication. As of 2023, more than 300 commitments have been made.

== History ==
BSAG was established on 3 March 2008. Together with the President of the Republic of Finland and the Prime Minister of Finland, BSAG organised the Baltic Sea Action Summit in Helsinki on 10 February 2010. The summit brought together Baltic Sea Heads of State and more than 140 companies and organisations to commit to efforts to restore the Baltic Sea. This commitment was a prerequisite for participation in the Summit.

== Names ==
The official name of the foundation is the Living Baltic Foundation. It has been translated into all 14 languages of the Baltic Sea basin. For convenience, the Living Baltic Foundation uses the working name BSAG – Baltic Sea Action Group.

Name of the Foundation:

- Finnish — Elävä Itämeri säätiö;
- English — Foundation for a Living Baltic Sea;
- Swedish — Stiftelsen för ett levande Östersjön;
- Russian — Living Baltica Foundation;
- German — Stiftung Lebende Ostsee;
- Estonian, Elava Läänemere fond;
- Latvian — Fonds dzīvībai Baltijas jūrā;
- Lithuanian — Gyvos Baltijos Jūros Fondas;
- Norwegian — Stiftelsen Den levende Østersjøen;
- Danish — Foreningen for en levende Østersø;
- Polish — Fundacja Nadzieja Dla Bałtyku;
- Belarusian — Fundatsia "Zhiva Baltyka";
- Czech — Nadace pro živé Baltské moře;
- Slovak — Nadácia na ochranu Baltického mora;
- Ukrainian — Foundation "Zhiva Baltika".
