= 2021 North-East England shellfish die-off =

- Date: October 2021–to present
- Location: River Tees mouth Durham Coast Yorkshire Coast; 54.638°N 1.133°W
- Type: Mass shellfish death
- Cause: Contested (see text)

The 2021 North-East England shellfish die-off was a series of occasions where a mass of shellfish were found on beaches on the Durham and Yorkshire Coasts in northern England, either dead, or in stages of dying.

These events first occurred in October 2021, with re-occurrences in February, and September 2022, with concerns being raised at the amount of crabs, lobsters and other marine animals found dead. An initial investigation by the Department for Environment, Food and Rural Affairs (Defra) stated a large algal bloom had killed off the marine life. However, those working in the fishing industry and independent scientists, claimed the deaths was caused by pyridine poisoning, an effect of dredging in the River Tees.

A second government investigation, published in January 2023, stated neither an algal bloom or pyridine poisoning could explain the deaths over such a long period of time, wide area and the unusual twitching in crabs. The scientists concluded that a disease, "novel pathogen" was the "most likely cause of the mortality."

== Initial occurrence ==
In October 2021 thousands of dead crabs and lobsters were washed up on the Tees estuary and beaches along the North-East coast of England. The deaths were first reported in Seaton Carew, Redcar and Seaham. A 95% decline in the lobster and crab catch was noticed by those employed in the local fishing industry. A spokesperson for the Environment Agency said, "Samples of water, sediment, mussel and crab have been collected and are being sent to our labs for analysis to consider whether a pollution incident could have contributed to the deaths of the animals." The Centre for Environment, Fisheries and Aquaculture Science (Cefas) labs were also testing crustaceans for signs of disease. At the time of the initial waves of deaths, the Environment Agency stated that "there is no evidence of any link to recent strandings of marine mammals and seabirds across the UK and counties along the North Sea coast."

One theory that a new interconnector cable from Northumberland to Norway was responsible was rejected by the National Grid, saying the cables were 'well buried in the seabed, made of steel and unlikely to be broken by wildlife.' The electro-magnetic field given off by underwater power cables has been found to mesmerise brown crabs and cause biological changes, such as changes to the number of blood cells in the crabs’ bodies. However, in November 2021, sewage, seismic activity, and underwater cables were ruled out as a cause of the deaths by the Environment Agency.

Deaths of other marine creatures have been reported; a dead porpoise was photographed washed up on the beach at South Gare, close to the mouth of the Tees. Dead dogfish and sole have also been washed up. The public was advised to avoid areas of beach and coastline and to keep pets away from dead crustaceans. The Environment Agency, the Centre for Environment, Fisheries and Aquaculture Science, North Eastern Inshore Fisheries and Conservation Authority, the Marine Management Organisation, Hartlepool Borough Council and Redcar and Cleveland Borough Council, were all involved in the investigation of the cause of the incidents. By late November the crustacean die-off had spread as far south as Robin Hood's Bay and was affecting catches in Whitby. Some of the crabs and lobsters which had washed up on the beaches were in various states of dying, with "twitching and lethargic" behaviour reported.

By January 2022 over 150 dogs had suffered vomiting and diarrhoea after they visited beaches in North Yorkshire. Dogs walked on beaches at Bridlington, Whitby, Robin Hood's Bay, South Gare near Redcar, and Scarborough had been affected. The Small Animal Veterinary Surveillance Network (SAVSNET) put forward the theory that the dogs might have contracted the Canine Enteric Coronavirus. A cluster of cases have been found inland at Leeds and Kirklees. Alan Radford, a Professor of Veterinary Health Informatics at the University of Liverpool, said, "Analysis of real-time data collected by SAVSNET from veterinary practices suggests that in Yorkshire, levels of disease have been statistically higher than we would expect for three weeks – we can therefore call this an outbreak in Yorkshire." The Department for Environment Food & Rural Affairs (Defra) said, "We are not aware of any link with the issue of crustaceans washed ashore in the area late last year [and domestic pets]."

== Investigations ==
The Environment Agency has ruled out chemical pollution as the cause of the mass shellfish deaths. Dredging was also rejected as the cause of the environmental disaster. Environment Agency operations manager Sarah Jennings said, "We've used both traditional and innovative screening methods to analyse samples of water, sediment and crab looking for traces of contamination. We’ve screened for over 1,000 potential chemical contaminants but found no anomalies that could lead to an event of this scale." The South Tees Development Corporation, who are responsible for the dredging of the Tees, stated that "we continue to follow all legal standards and requirements as is required, including the issued licence and guidance from DEFRA and MMO, who continue to rule out dredging as a likely cause."

Whilst official direction was that dredging was not the cause of the die-off, many fishermen state that they believe this to be the root cause. Defra, which started an investigation in December 2021, stated the die-off was the result of an algal bloom, however, some academics have raised the dredging issue as the shellfish had high levels of pyridine. The North East Fishing Collective (NEFC) crowdfunded a £30,000 study conducted by researchers at Newcastle, Durham, Hull and York universities, who concluded that the levels of pyridine resulted in the mass deaths. "Although it is yet to be peer reviewed, the study's early report said tests found pyridine, which is used as an anti-corrosion treatment in marine infrastructure, was "highly toxic" to crabs "even at low levels" and caused twitching and paralysis before death similar to witness reports made at the time of the mass wash-ups." Defra rejected the claim about pyridine poisoning, stating that pyridine was present in healthy crabs studied during the same period off the coast of Cornwall. They also stated that there was no link between the die-off and any dead seals on the North-East coast.

In early February 2022 it was reported that, "Defra and partner agencies have completed a thorough investigation of the cause of dead crabs and lobsters which were found washed up on the North East coast between October and December 2021. Following significant testing and modelling to rule out possible causes, Defra and partner agencies consider that the deaths of the crabs and lobsters potentially resulted from a naturally occurring harmful algal bloom." In June 2022 George Monbiot wrote in The Guardian, "Astonishingly, although there is no evidence that it conducted such sampling, the government concluded not only that a bloom had occurred, but that it was caused by a particular, toxic species: Karenia mikimotoi. This is the stuff of science fiction. Karenia thrives in temperatures between 20 and 24 °C [68 and 75 °F]. The average water temperature on this coast in October is 13 °C [55 °F]. There is no plausible mechanism by which a Karenia bloom could cause the mass death of lobsters and crabs without also killing large numbers of fish, sea urchins and many other species." Monbiot reported that when he asked the UK government to publish its evidence the government refused.

Tim Deere-Jones, a pollution researcher and consultant for over 30 years, was asked to investigate the incidents by Whitby Fishermen's Association. A Freedom of Information request to the Department for Environment Food & Rural Affairs revealed some crab samples were found to have concentrations of the chemical pyridine 70 times over the expected level. Deere-Jones said, "The Environment Agency must have analysed for several hundred different chemicals, most of which were there in .0-something quantities, some of which were in quantities up to the tens, but what really stood out was pyridine, which was present up to 450-plus. Apart from being astonished that nobody picked up that this one chemical was there in such quantities, I was astonished that nobody suggested that there be further work." Marine infrastructure which sits in the water is treated with pyridine to reduce corrosion, and the chemical is also released as an industrial waste product. One crab sample from Saltburn was found to contain 439mg per kg of pyridine, and 203mg per kg was found in a sample tested from Seaton. A control sample from Cornwall showed levels of 5.9mg per kg. Deere-Jones challenged the Defra conclusion, saying, "There was marine algae out there but it wasn't really what you'd call a bloom, and nobody took any samples to prove it was a lethal algal bloom."

=== December 2022 investigation ===
Another government investigation was instigated in November 2022, and was supposed to deliver its findings a month later, but it was not released to the public until January 2023. The terms of reference for the investigation, and the names of the scientists involved was deliberately kept secret to avoid pressure being put on the scientists and to enable them to complete the review free from "lobbying...in what has become an increasingly bitter debate." The report was released on 20 January 2023, and came to no definitive conclusion. The report stated that neither an algal bloom or pyridine poisoning could "..explain the deaths over such a long period of time and wide area of coastline, the unusual twitching observed by crabs or why only crustaceans and not a greater number of species had suffered the effects." The scientists raised the possibility of a new parasite or disease as the likely source of the deaths, but there were no signs of this, labelling a "novel pathogen" as the "most likely cause of the mortality."

== Further occurrences ==
More crabs were washed up on beaches in the North-East of England during February 2022.

Concerns were raised again in September 2022, after local people at Markse and Saltburn identified another swathe of shellfish being washed up on the beach. However, the Environment Agency countered that it was "a regular occurrence at this time of year."

== Aftermath ==
The mass die-off had a detrimental effect on the shellfish ports of Yorkshire (Bridlington, Scarborough and Whitby), and so the Whitby Lobster Hatchery had forwarded a plan to put thousands of juvenile lobsters into the North Sea. Even so, one of the marine biologists at the hatchery warned that it would "take years" for the stocks to recover.

In early October 2022, Hundreds of protestors linked arms across Saltburn beach. The protestors were part of the campaign group Reclaim the Seas, who wanted the dredging of the Tees Estuary to stop. As a result of the NEFIC report, which blamed the mass die-off on pyridine poisoning, a Parliamentary committee meeting was announced for 25 October 2022, to investigate the claims. The committee heard that those who work in the fishing industry around the Tees and the County Durham and North Yorkshire coasts, were "terrified [of the] dredging going ahead", with one stating that they were experiencing an "extinction episode". The committee heard from the secretary of Whitby Commercial Fishing Association, who stated that the lobster catch was down 50%, undersized and pregnant lobsters were down 75%, and brown crabs were down 100%.

In November 2022, the Scarborough MP, Robert Goodwill, recommended setting up a fund to provide financial support to communities affected by the shellfish die-off.
