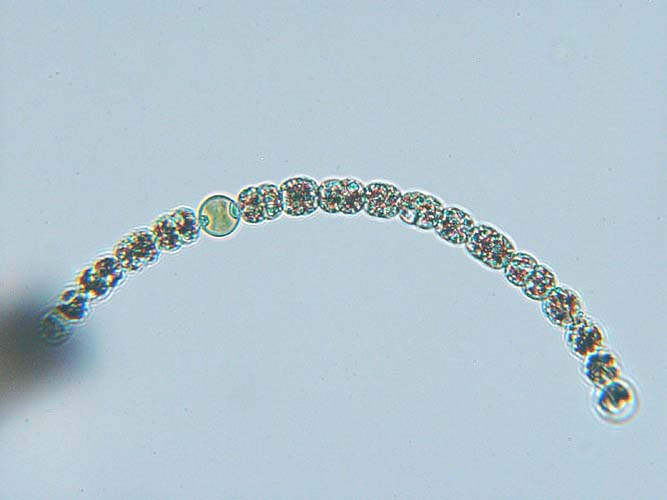
- Anabaena circinalis filament

Scientific classification
- Domain: Bacteria
- Kingdom: Bacillati
- Phylum: Cyanobacteriota
- Class: Cyanophyceae
- Order: Nostocales
- Family: Nostocaceae
- Genus: Anabaena
- Species: A. circinalis

Binomial name
- Anabaena circinalis Rabenhorst ex Bornet & Flahault, 1886

= Anabaena circinalis =

Species of bacterium

Anabaena circinalis is a species of Gram-negative, photosynthetic cyanobacteria commonly found in freshwater environments throughout the world. Much of the scientific interest in A. circinalis owes to its production of several potentially harmful cyanotoxins, ranging in potency from irritating to lethal. Under favorable conditions for growth, A. circinalis forms large algae-like blooms, potentially harming the flora and fauna of an area.

== Morphology ==
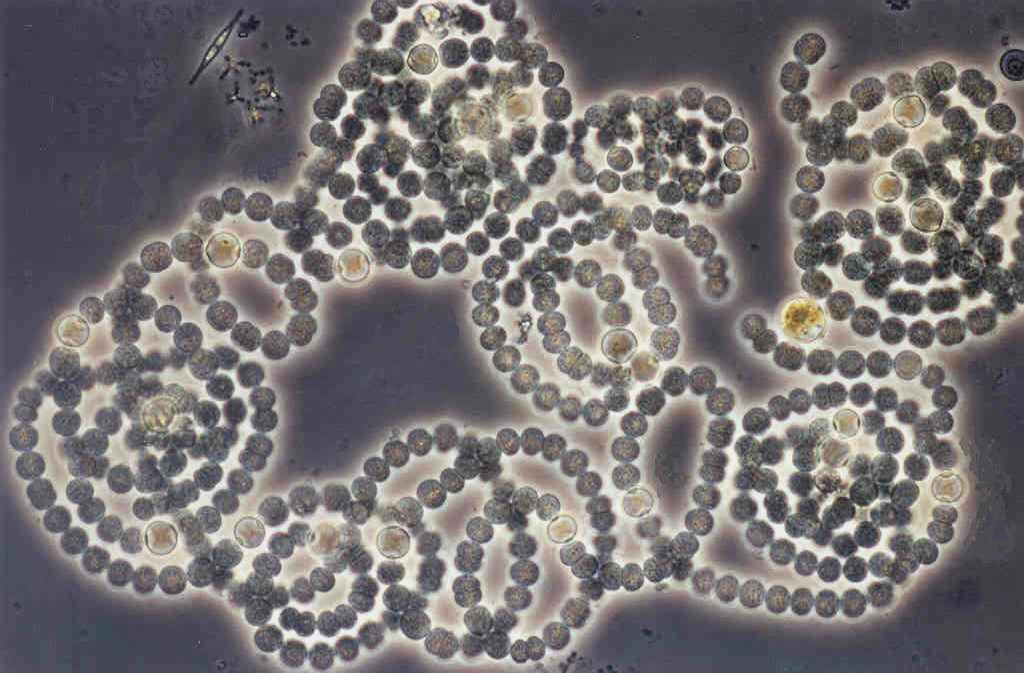
Anabaena circinalis

Anabaena circinalis exhibits a filamentous morphology, each filament a string of task-specific cells. The appearance of cell differentiation was a great evolutionary leap; marking cyanobacteria as one of the first multicellular organisms on Earth. On the A. circinalis filament, the most numerous structures are vegetative cells, responsible for the photosynthesis of high-energy sugars from environmental carbon, water, and sunlight. The energy from photosynthesis is used, in part, for the biosynthesis of cellular materials from nitrogenous compounds. During periods when combined nitrogen (e.g. ammonia or nitrate) is unavailable, A. circinalis form heterocysts, larger, round, nitrogen-fixing cells found every ten to twenty cells or so on the filament. Heterocysts function to convert environmental nitrogen (N_{2}) into compounds such as ammonia or nitrate. Nitrogenase, an oxygen-sensitive enzyme, is essential to this conversion. For the proper functioning of nitrogenase, the intracellular environment of the heterocyst must be anaerobic, a task achieved by the oxygen-impermeable structure of the heterocyst wall. Although functioning independent of each other, vegetative cells and heterocysts are both essential to the survival of the organism; vegetative cells providing energy-rich sugars to the organism, while heterocysts fix nitrogen for amino acid production and cellular biosynthesis. Also found along the filaments are gas vacuoles, specialized compartments that inflate or deflate with air to provide upward or downward movement. This adaptation positions A. circinalis at a favorable depth, determined by available sunlight, water temperature, or O_{2} concentration. With optimal environmental conditions, Anabaena circinalis grow unchecked, forming large blooms that appear as a greenish slime at the surface of the water (fig. 2). In harsh conditions, A. circinalis form spore-like cells called akinetes. Akinetes are resistant to low temperature, desiccation, and darkness. Often, akinetes will hibernate in sediment until environmental conditions allow germination and re-growth.

== Neurotoxins ==
North American and European strains of Anabaena circinalis produce anatoxin-a, one of the first cyanobacterial neurotoxins identified. In the late 1950s, research began in earnest following several cattle deaths attributed to contaminated drinking water. Due in part to the relatively short time from ingestion to death, the toxin was ominously coined Very Fast Death Factor (VFDF). Anatoxin-a functions as a postsynaptic nicotinic agonist, binding to acetylcholine receptors at the neuromuscular junctions. However, unlike acetylcholine, anatoxin-a is not degradable by cholinesterase, resulting in a persistent muscle contraction. This disruption presents as coordination loss, paralysis, muscle twitching, shortness of breath, and possibly death. Biological toxicity aside, Anabaena circinalis blooms have the potential to disrupt commercial fishing areas, water-treatment facilities, and recreational waterways. Add to this the high cost of toxicity monitoring, and it's apparent that Anabaena circinalis can have a detrimental economic impact as well. In some freshwater environments of Australia, A. circinalis are known to produce paralytic shellfish toxins (PSTs), a neurotoxin also found in some marine dinoflagellates. Severe PST intoxication can result in a potentially fatal illness known as paralytic shellfish poisoning (PSP). PSTs are in a class of poisons known as the saxitoxins, which are among the most toxic naturally produced substances. Saxitoxin poisoning begins with the blockage of sodium and potassium channels, quickly leading to a decrease in neural action potentials, flaccid paralysis, respiratory arrest, and eventually death.

== Phylogeny ==
Regardless of geographic location, A. circinalis are monophyletic, having evolved from a cyanobacterial ancestor approximately 1-2 billion years ago. Because PST-producing A. circinalis is morphologically similar to non-PST strains, attempts are being made to subdivide these populations further. Historically, PCR primers have been employed to isolate and analyze 16S rRNA, a highly conserved region of the cyanobacterial ribosomal subunit. However, newer assays focusing on base variations in rpoC1 genes have proven to be more precise at both the genus and species level. This precision provides an increasingly accurate determination of the presence or absence of PSTs among A. circinalis species.

== Applications ==
The toxins produced by Anabaena circinalis (and similar species) occur in many different analogs, each varying in toxicity. Biotransformation experiments have shown promise in the chemical conversion of highly toxic PSTs into less toxic forms. This process may provide a way to detoxify dangerous blooms before they cause irreparable damage. Additionally, some forms of PSTs have shown promise as long-lasting anesthetics for various chronic medical conditions. The United States Military has researched saxitoxin since the 1950s, naming the toxin Agent TZ. In 1960, while piloting the now-infamous 'U-2 Incident' over Russian airspace, CIA pilot Francis Gary Powers was rumored to have had a saxitoxin "suicide pill", which he was later criticized for not using upon his capture. Military researchers have since found the aerosol dispersion of saxitoxin to have a much higher toxicity than both sarin nerve gas and ricin, leading to the possibility of using saxitoxins on the battlefield. However, the Chemical Weapons Convention (CWC) of 1993 categorized saxitoxins as a Schedule 1 substance, meaning:

- Saxitoxins have the potential to be used as a biological weapon, or as a precursor to another weapon.
- Saxitoxins have no practical use outside of weapons manufacture.

As per the CWC, stockpiles of all chemical weapons, including saxitoxin, were to be destroyed by the year 2010.
