= Saxidomus =

Scientific classification
- Kingdom: Animalia
- Phylum: Mollusca
- Class: Bivalvia
- Order: Venerida
- Family: Veneridae
- Genus: Saxidomus; Conrad, 1837

Species
- See text.

Genus of bivalves

Saxidomus, common name the "Washington clams", is a genus of large edible saltwater clams, marine bivalve mollusks in the family Veneridae, the Venus clams.

The species Saxidomus gigantea is known as the "butter clam".

The term for saxitoxin (the neurotoxin found in paralytic shellfish poisoning) is derived from the genus name Saxidomus.

== Species ==
Species within the genus Saxidomus include:

Image	Scientific name	Common name	Distribution
	Saxidomus gigantea	Butter clam	Western coast of North America, ranging from the Aleutian Islands to San Francisco Bay
	Saxidomus nuttalli	California butterclam and Washington clam	Northern California to Baja California
	Saxidomus purpurata	Purple butter clam	Western Pacific China and Japan
