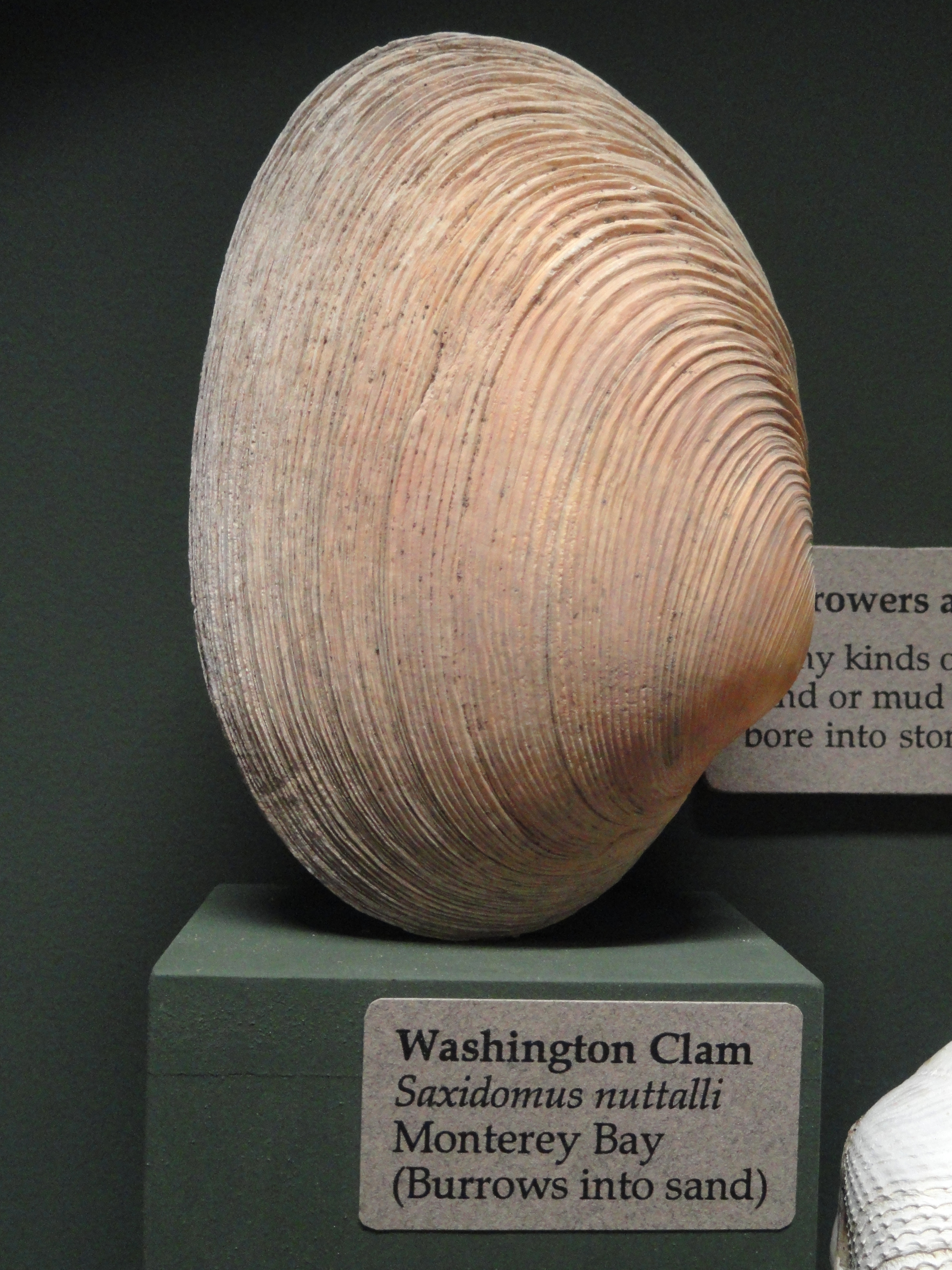

Scientific classification
- Kingdom: Animalia
- Phylum: Mollusca
- Class: Bivalvia
- Order: Venerida
- Superfamily: Veneroidea
- Family: Veneridae
- Genus: Saxidomus
- Species: S. nuttalli

Binomial name
- Saxidomus nuttalli Dixon, 1788

= Saxidomus nuttalli =

Species of bivalve

Saxidomus nuttalli is a species of large edible saltwater clam, a marine bivalve mollusk in the family Veneridae, the venus clams. Common names include California butterclam and Washington clam.

This clam is native to the west coast of North America, its distribution extending from northern California to Baja California.

This is a commercially exploited species that attains a length of approximately 15 cm.

== Archaeology ==
This species was harvested by Chumash peoples on the central California coast, at least as early as the Millingstone Horizon. The shells were used as currency by local native peoples.

== See also ==
- Intertidal zone
