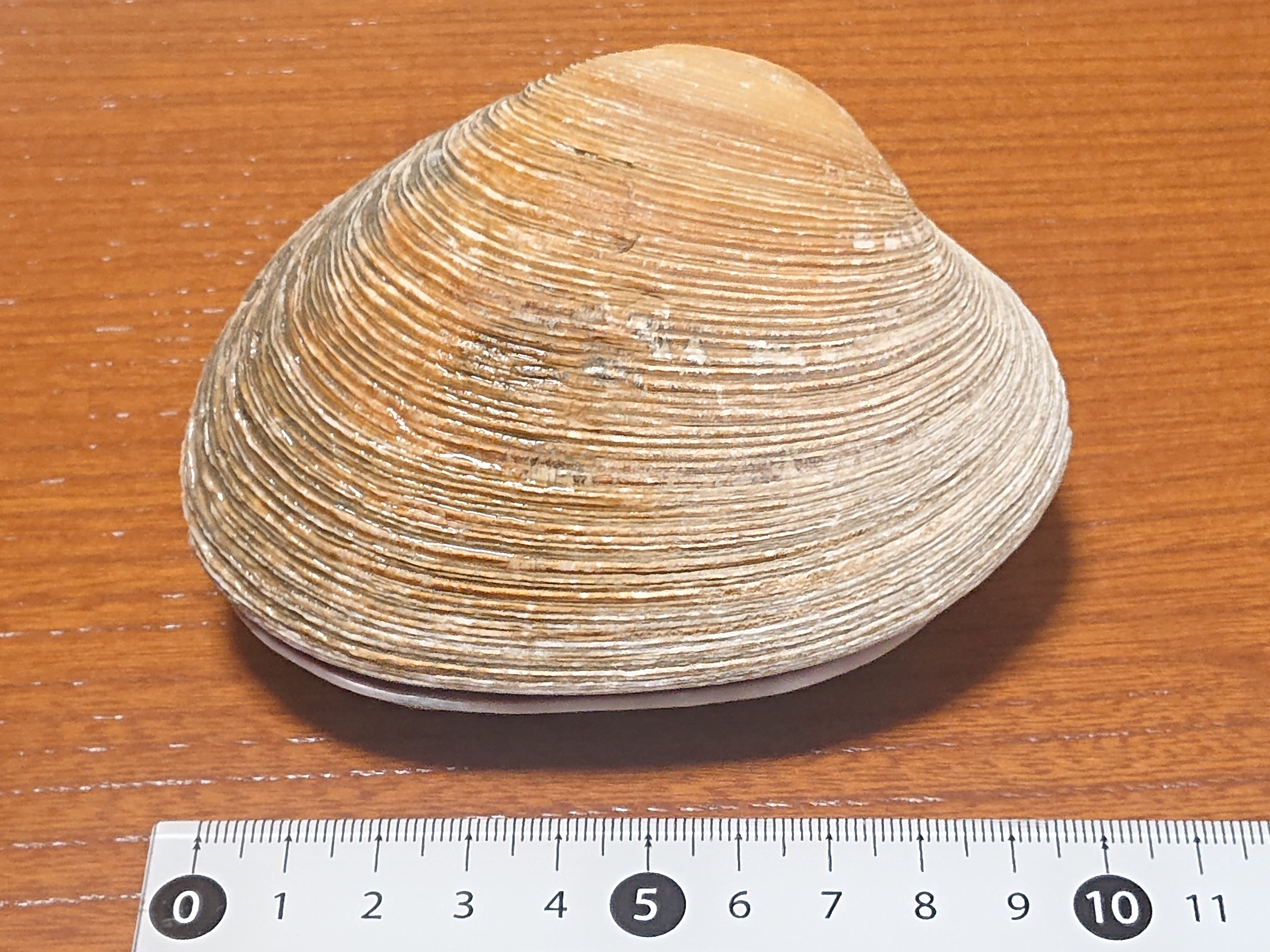

Scientific classification
- Domain: Eukaryota
- Kingdom: Animalia
- Phylum: Mollusca
- Class: Bivalvia
- Order: Venerida
- Family: Veneridae
- Genus: Saxidomus
- Species: S. purpurata

Binomial name
- Saxidomus purpurata Sowerby II, 1852

= Saxidomus purpurata =

Species of bivalve

Saxidomus purpurata, or purple butter clam, is a species of large edible saltwater clams, marine bivalve mollusks in the family Veneridae, the Venus clams. It is found in the northwest Pacific Ocean near China and Japan from 0–20 metres deep.

== As food ==
In Japan, the clam is known as uchimurasaki or ō-asari, and is often grilled.

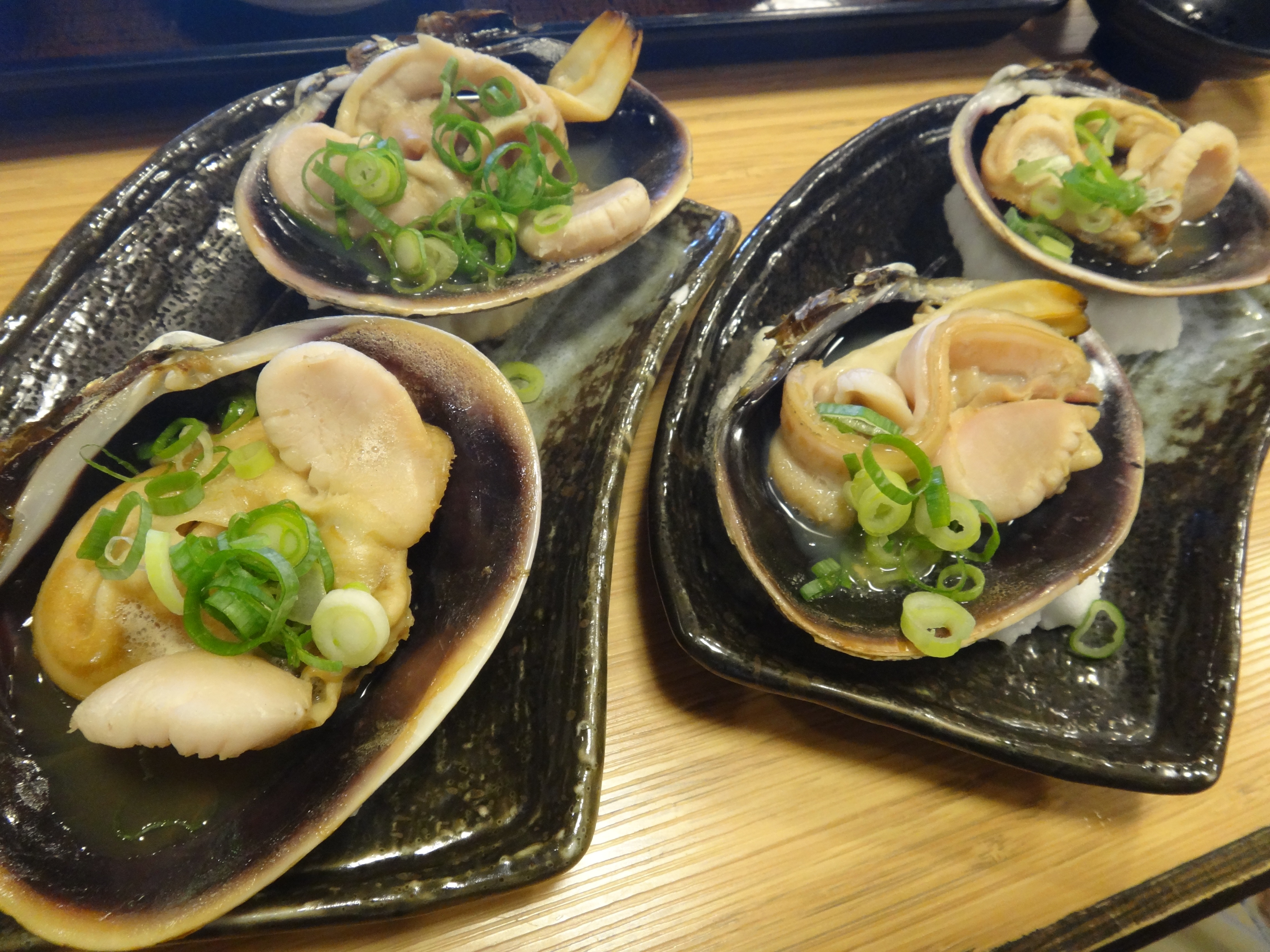

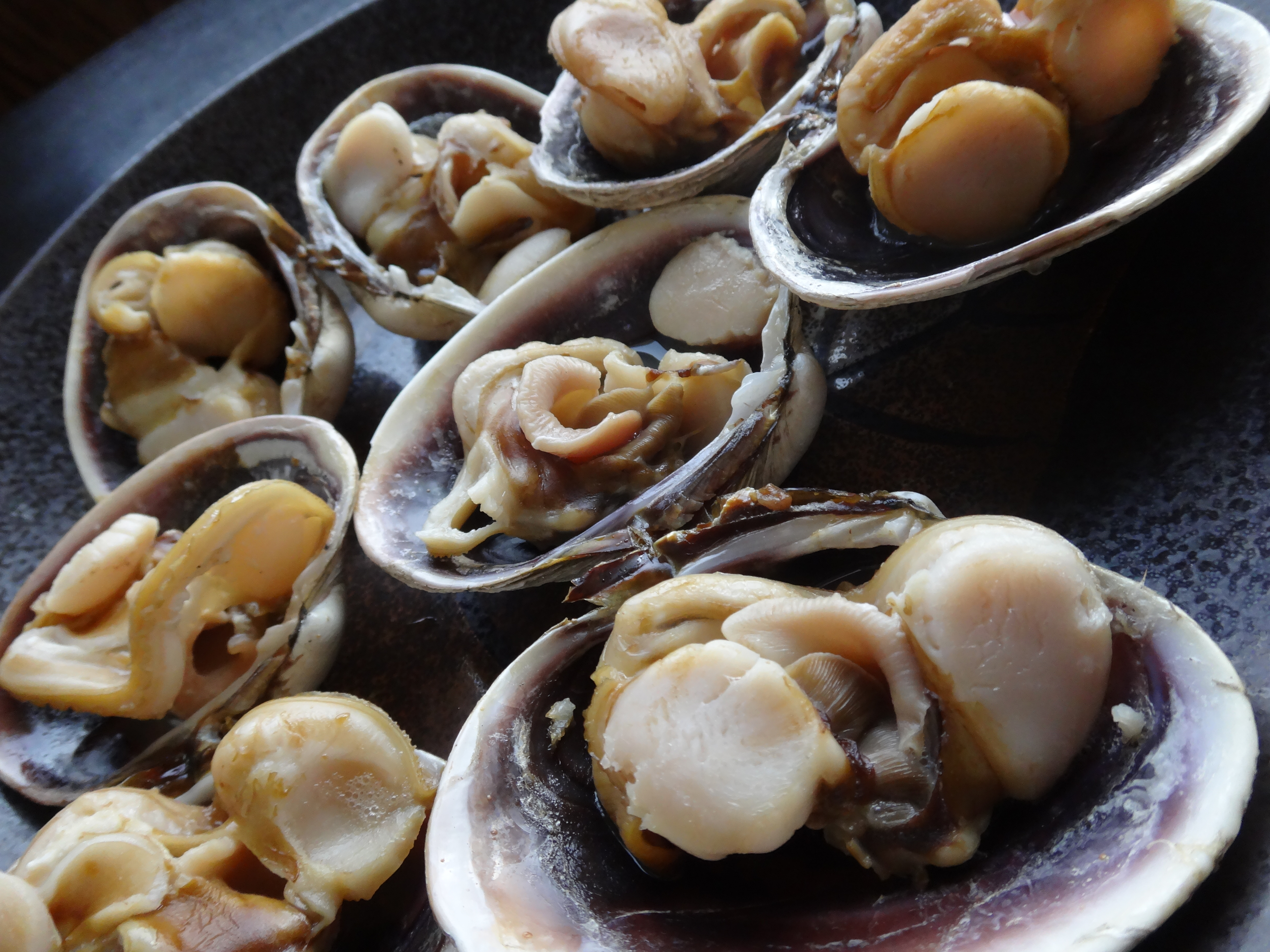

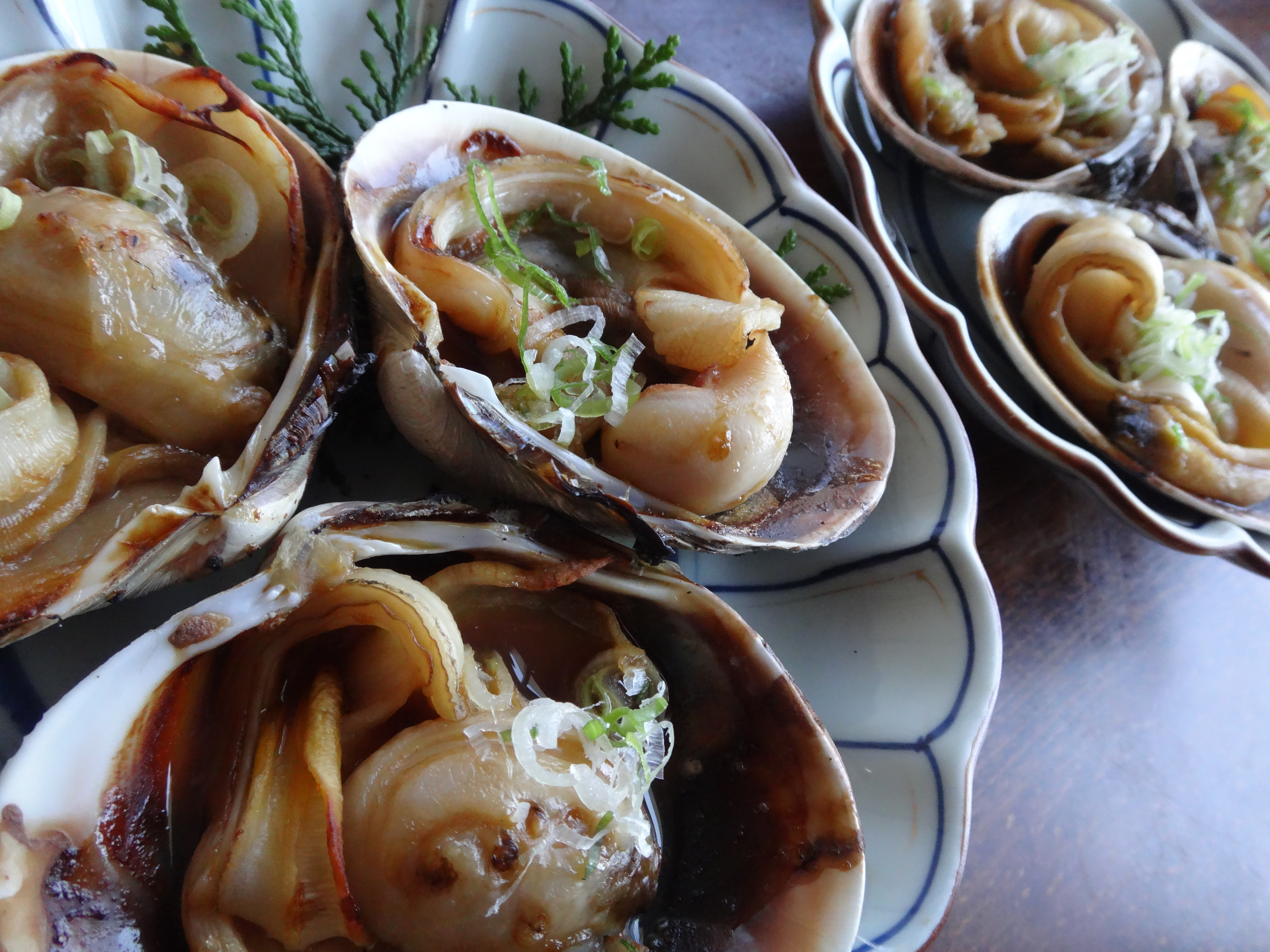

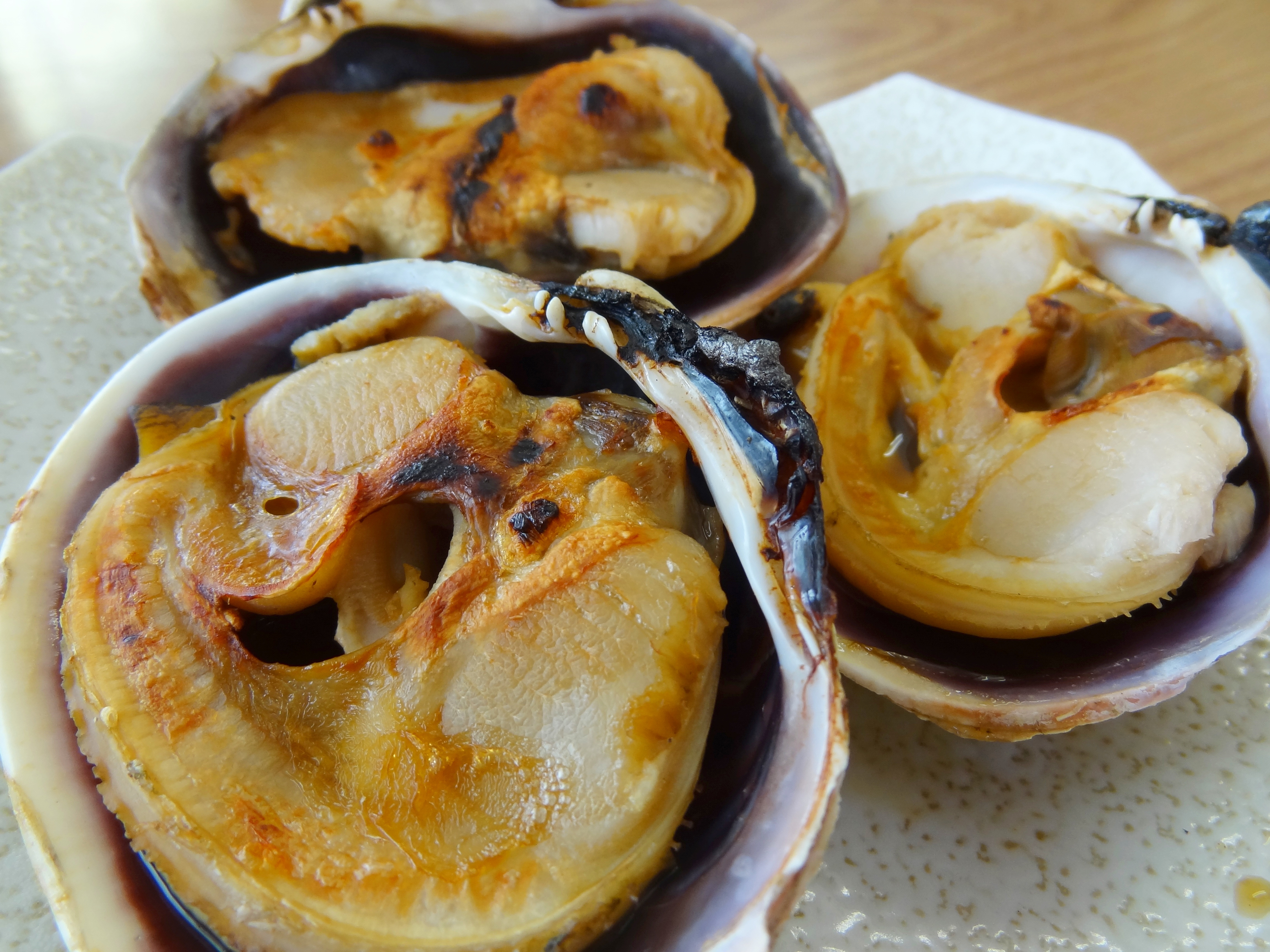
