= Dissodinium =

Scientific classification
- Domain: Eukaryota
- Clade: Sar
- Clade: Alveolata
- Division: Dinoflagellata
- Class: Dinophyceae
- Order: Gymnodiniales
- Genus: Dissodinium; Klebs

Genus of algae

Dissodinium is a genus of dinoflagellates belonging to the order Gymnodiniales, family unknown.

== Species ==
Species:

- Dissodinium bicorne (Kofoid & Swezy) F.J.R.Taylor
- Dissodinium bocornis (Kofoid & Swezy) F.J.R.Taylor
- Dissodinium elegans (Pavillard) Matzenauer
