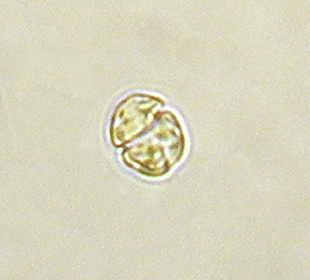

Scientific classification
- Domain: Eukaryota
- Clade: Sar
- Clade: Alveolata
- Phylum: Dinoflagellata
- Class: Dinophyceae
- Order: Gymnodiniales
- Family: Gymnodiniaceae
- Genus: Gymnodinium; Stein, 1878

= Gymnodinium =

Genus of single-celled organisms

Gymnodinium is a genus of dinoflagellates, a type of marine and freshwater plankton. It is one of the few naked dinoflagellates, or species lacking armor known as cellulosic plates. Since 2000, the species which had been considered to be part of Gymnodinium have been divided into several genera, based on the nature of the apical groove and partial LSU rDNA sequence data. Amphidinium was redefined later. Gymnodinium belong to red dinoflagellates that, in concentration, can cause red tides. The red tides produced by some Gymnodinium, such as Gymnodinium catenatum, are toxic and pose risks to marine and human life, including paralytic shellfish poisoning.

== Segregate genera ==
- Gymnodinium sensu stricto
- Akashiwo
- Amphidinium
- Gyrodinium
- Karenia
- Karlodinium
- Katodinium

== Former species ==
Torodinium (with Torodinium robustum and the type species Torodinium teredo) were both formerly Gymnodinium teredo until 1921.
