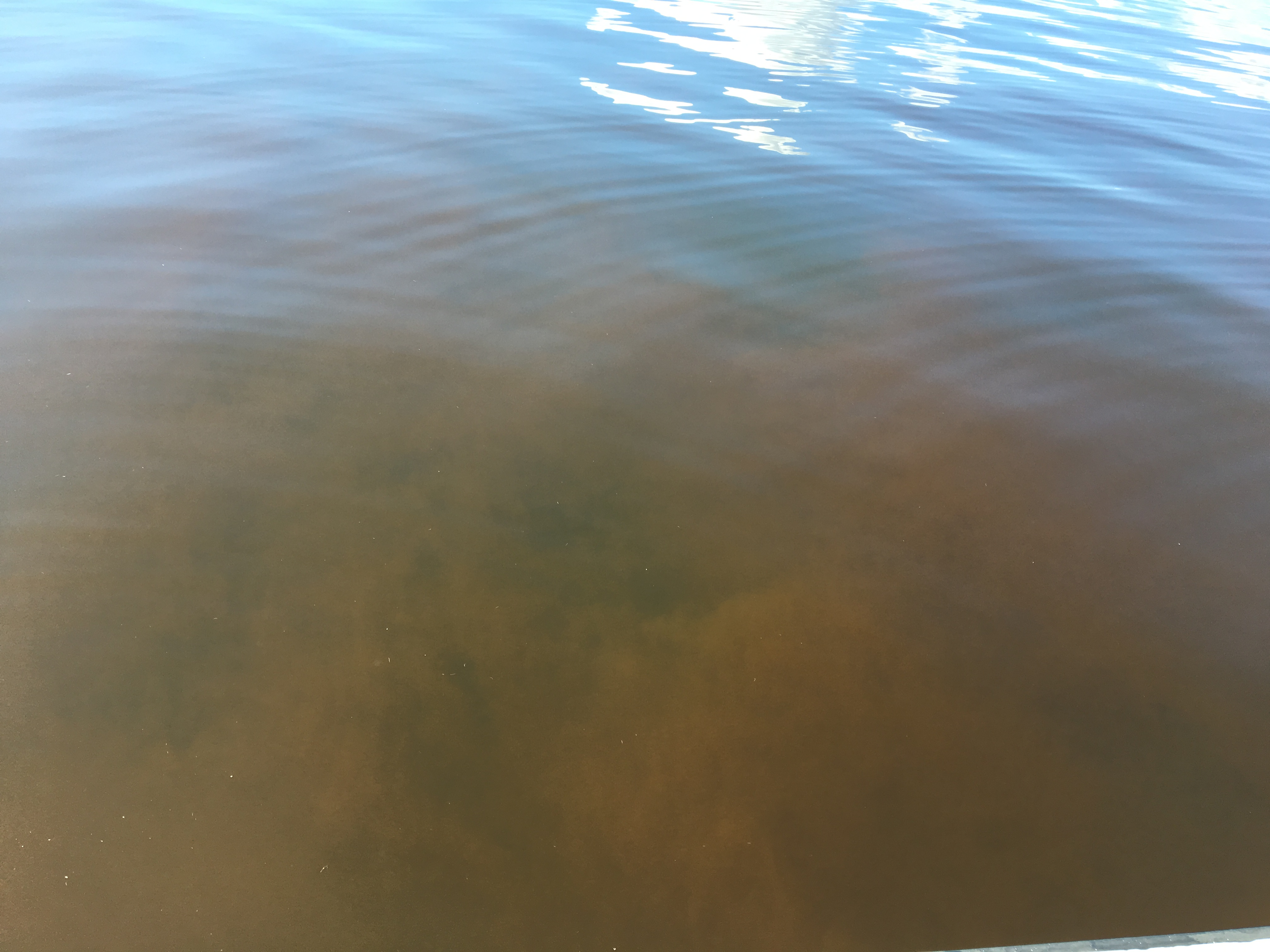
- A Cochlodinium polykrikoides bloom in Narragansett Bay, RI.

Scientific classification
- Domain: Eukaryota
- Clade: Sar
- Clade: Alveolata
- Phylum: Dinoflagellata
- Class: Dinophyceae
- Order: Gymnodiniales
- Family: Gymnodiniaceae
- Genus: Cochlodinium
- Species: C. polykrikoides

Binomial name
- Cochlodinium polykrikoides Margalef

= Cochlodinium polykrikoides =

Species of single-celled organism

Cochlodinium polykrikoides (or Margalefidinium polykrikoides) is a species of red tide producing marine dinoflagellates known for causing fish kills around the world, and well known for fish kills in marine waters of Southeast Asia. C. polykrikoides has a wide geographic range, including North America, Central America, Western India, Southwestern Europe and Eastern Asia. Single cells of this species are ovoidal in shape, 30-50μm in length and 25-30μm in width.

Cochlodinium polykrikoides is a highly motile organism. They are generally found in aggregations of 4 or 8 cell zooids. Chain length is known to be affected by the presence of grazers and the inclusion of vitamins B_{1}, B_{7} and B_{12}. This species is also capable of mixotrophy, which makes them extremely persistent during a large algal bloom. C. polykrikoides exhibits diel vertical migration.

Cochlodinium is thought to have a cyst-type overwintering stage in their life cycle. This process allows C. polykrikoides to produce a specialized cell that is non-motile. These cells aggregate and rest in certain basins until conditions allow for reproduction and colonies to form.

== Optimal growth conditions ==
Cochlodinium polykrikoides is a euryhaline species, capable of surviving a wide range of salinities. Growth experiments have shown that C. polykrikoides can have greater than 0.3 divisions day^{−1} in optimal growth conditions (25 °C, 34ppt). The growth range C. polykrikoides is 15 °C-30 °C, 20-36ppt and >30μmol m^{−2} s^{−1} irradiance. There has been no observed photo-inhibition for C. polykrikoides under high irradiance.

== Toxicity ==
Cochlodinium polykrikoides is a species that can produce allelopathic chemicals. These chemicals inhibit the growth of other phytoplankton taxa in the water column. The production of such toxins can play important roles in the formation of Harmful Algal Blooms. C. polykrikoides can also generate reactive oxygen species which are lethal to both pelagic fish and shellfish even in low concentrations.

== Massive blooms ==
In late 2008 and early 2009 (November–February) there was a massive bloom of Cochlodinium polykrikoides in the Sea of Oman, off the coast of Oman in the Persian Sea. It was notable for being based on Cochlodinium polykrikoides rather than the Noctiluca scintillans (Noctiluca miliaris) that had been more usual in the immediately previous years. The bloom resulted in massive dying off of fish, damage to coral reefs, and interference with desalinization plants.

=== Conditions for a bloom ===
1. Sea Surface Temperature (SST)- SST has been shown to be a huge factor in the growth of C. polykrikoides and thus determining when blooms form. Lab studies have shown that C. polykrikoides have the most significant growth between 25.0˚C and 26.0˚C.
2. Photosynthetically Available Radiation (PAR)- As for almost all planktonic species, there needs to be enough light for these phytoplankton to photosynthesize. Studies have proven that C. polykrikoides have higher growth rates when solar insolation is increased.
3. Favorable Transport- Many are unsure of the source of where C. polykrikoides are generally found, however, currents play an important role when transporting these toxic phytoplankton to favorable areas for a bloom to spawn.
4. Upwelling- The nutrient-rich waters that are brought to the photic layer by upwelling hold nutrients (nitrogen compounds, phosphorus compounds, etc.) that are essential in photosynthesis and cell growth. An appropriate wind is needed to cause this upwelling and while also ensuring temperature and transport are also favorable for C. polykrikoides blooms.

As climate change continues to affect the oceans, it is predicted that harmful algal blooms (such as red tides caused by Cochlodinium polykrikoides) will be more frequent in the upcoming years.
