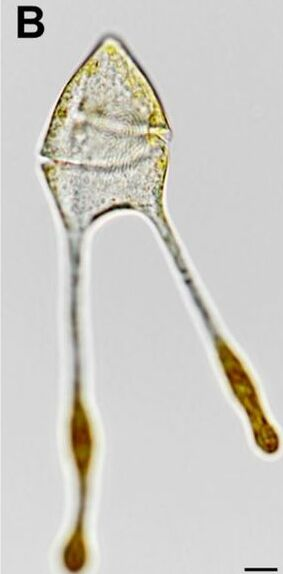

Scientific classification
- Domain: Eukaryota
- Clade: Sar
- Clade: Alveolata
- Phylum: Dinoflagellata
- Class: Dinophyceae
- Order: Gymnodiniales
- Family: Ceratoperidiniaceae
- Genus: Ceratoperidinium
- Species: C. margalefii

Binomial name
- Ceratoperidinium margalefii A.R.Loeblich III, 1980

= Ceratoperidinium margalefii =

Species of single-celled organism

Ceratoperidinium margalefii, also known as Ceratoperidinium yeye, is a species of dinoflagellates. This species has two flagella. Their resemblance to the legs of a girl dancing inspired its original name, Ceratoperidinium yeye, in reference to the female-dominated yé-yé pop music and dance of the 1960s.
