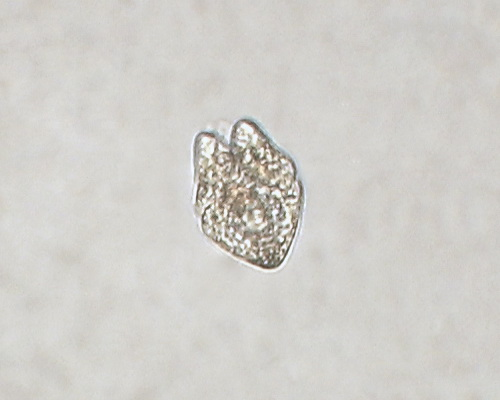

Scientific classification
- Domain: Eukaryota
- Clade: Sar
- Superphylum: Alveolata
- Phylum: Dinoflagellata
- Class: Dinophyceae
- Order: Gymnodiniales
- Family: Gymnodiniaceae
- Genus: Akashiwo; G.Hansen & Moestrup
- Species: A. sanguinea

Binomial name
- Akashiwo sanguinea (K.Hirasaka) G.Hansen & Moestrup

= Akashiwo =

Species of single-celled organism

Akashiwo sanguinea is a species of marine dinoflagellates well known for forming blooms that result in red tides. It is the only species in the genus Akashiwo. The organism is unarmored (naked). Therefore, it lacks a thick cellulose wall, the theca, common in other genera of dinoflagellates. Reproduction of the phytoplankton species is primarily asexual.

Recently recognized as mixotrophic, A. sanguinea is capable of preying on various organisms. For example, A. sanguinea is found to be capable of ingesting the cyanobacterium Synechococcus sp. at values comparable to other heterotrophic phytoplankton. This suggests implications it may have on the grazing impact of Synechococcus.

== Description ==
Despite its lack of thecal plates, a prominent feature helpful in identifying armored flagellates, A. sanguinea is relatively large and easily recognizable. Like most dinoflagellates, one flagellum is complex, wrapping around the equator of the cell in a groove. The other flagellum extends out from the cell to help aid its movement through the water. A. sanguinea's most prominent features are the lack of a nuclear envelope chamber and the apical groove's large, clockwise path when viewed from the front of the cell. These features, along with observations and data from LSU rDNA sequencing, recently helped declare a new genus for this species (Hansen & Moestrup).

== Etymology ==
The genus name akashiwo is Japanese for red tide.

== Distribution ==
Akashiwo sanguinea covers a broad range of distributions. Frequent blooms exist off the coast of Florida and Southern California. Blooms dominated by this species have also been observed in Narragansett Bay, Rhode Island.

== Behavior and physiology ==
Akashiwo sanguinea exhibits a diurnal vertical migration pattern, observed to move toward the sun in field experiments even before the start of the light cycle. In laboratory settings, the migration is light dependent but the direction of movement is not solely explained by positive phototaxis. It has also been shown to swim across large gradients in temperature. However, more study is needed to determine the organisms' migratory behavior.

Akashiwo sanguinea responds to certain changes in the water column by forming subsurface chlorophyll maximum layers in the marine environment. A study off of Southern California's coast observed a subsurface layer when nitrate was limiting to the organism. A. sangiunea's subsurface chlorophyll maximum layer has contributed to the success of larval anchovy growth on California's coastline. The larva have been observed to ingest this organism and not other species such as Chaetoceros spp. and Thalassiosira spp. suggesting a preference for A. sanguinea over other dinoflagellates.

== Context and content ==
Synonyms Gymnodinium splendens (Lebour), Gymnodinium sanguineum (Hirasaka), Gymnodinium nelsoni (Martin)

The names listed above were used during prior research on the organism. The genus is now redefined into four new genera. Gymnodinium was one of many dinoflagellate genera declared when taxonomic nomenclature was limited to features only visible with the light microscope. In 2000, Hansen and Moestrup analyzed ultrastructural details of the organism using large-subunit (LSU) rDNA sequencing. Aided by this new technology, the scientists were able to declare variations in the path of the apical groove of the organism (found on the flagellar apparatus). Since the apical groove varies among species, the scientists used it to indicate differences between the unarmored flagellates. Akashiwo was one of four new genera that was redefined using the analysis.

== HAB implications ==
Akashiwo sanguinea has been correlated to harmful algal blooms (HABs), but more study is needed to make sense of the blooms.

The protist can produce mycosporine-like amino acids (MAAs) which are water-soluble surfactants. A red tide caused by A. sanguinea was coincident with widespread seabird mortality across fourteen different species of birds in November–December 2007 in Northeastern Monterey Bay, California. Plankton samples showed A. sanguinea as the dominant flagellate in the bloom. Affected birds accumulated a proteinaceous material on their feathers, causing a loss in the natural water repellency. However no toxins, such as domoic acid, saxitoxin or brevetoxin were detected in the water. It was the first documented case of its tide causing harm to birds. In 2009 a huge foam event blamed on Akashiwo sanguinea killed vast quantities of sea birds from the northern Oregon coast to the tip of the Olympic Peninsula in Washington state.

Despite being considered a non-toxic dinoflagellate for a long time, A. sanguinea has been found to produce toxins that affect other planktonic organisms and cause mass die-offs of fish and shellfish. During its growth phase, the protist can release compounds that lyse or inhibit other phytoplankton. It can also produce hemolytic compounds that are acutely toxic at higher trophic levels.

The species' blooms have also been linked to coral bleaching. More research is needed before predictions of HAB events that may be linked with this species.
