= Dicroerisma =

Scientific classification
- Domain: Eukaryota
- Clade: Diaphoretickes
- Clade: Sar
- Clade: Alveolata
- Phylum: Myzozoa
- Superclass: Dinoflagellata
- Class: Dinophyceae
- Order: Gymnodiniales
- Family: Dicroerismataceae
- Genus: Dicroerisma; F.J.R.Taylor & S.A.Cattell

Genus of protists

Dicroerisma is a genus of dinoflagellates, the sole genus of the family Dicroerismataceae.

Species:

- Dicroerisma psilonereiella F.J.R.Taylor & S.A.Cattell
