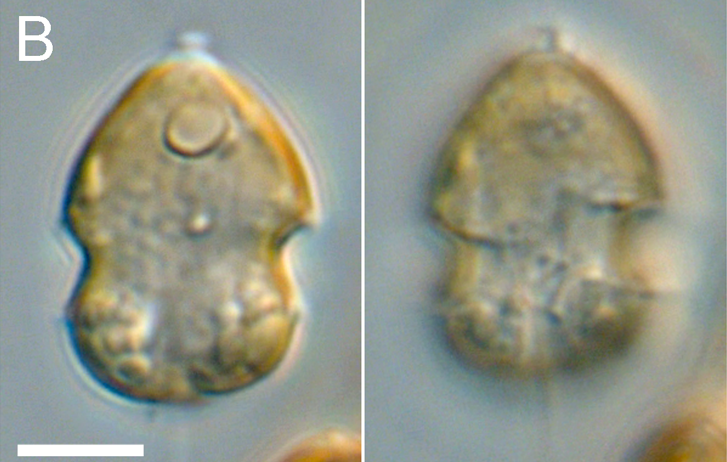

Scientific classification
- Domain: Eukaryota
- Clade: Diaphoretickes
- Clade: SAR
- Clade: Alveolata
- Phylum: Myzozoa
- Superclass: Dinoflagellata
- Class: Dinophyceae
- Family: Amphidomataceae
- Genus: Azadinium
- Species: A. spinosum

Binomial name
- Azadinium spinosum Elbrächter et Tillmann

= Azadinium spinosum =

Species of single-celled organism

Azadinium spinosum is a species of dinoflagellates that produces azaspiracid toxins (toxins associated with shellfish poisoning), particularly AZA 1, AZA 2 and an isomer of AZA 2.

== Description ==
It measures 12–16 μm in length and 7–11 μm wide, is a peridinin-containing photosynthetic dinoflagellate with a thin theca. Its large nucleus is spherical and present posteriorly, whereas its single chloroplast is parietal, lobed, and extends into the epi- and hyposome.
