= Torodinium =

Scientific classification
- Domain: Eukaryota
- Clade: Sar
- Clade: Alveolata
- Phylum: Dinoflagellata
- Class: Dinophyceae
- Order: Gymnodiniales
- Family: Gymnodiniaceae
- Genus: Torodinium

Species
- Torodinium teredo (type species); Torodinium robustum

Genus of single-celled organisms

Torodinium (ˌtɔɹoʊˈdɪniəm) is a genus of unarmored dinoflagellates and comprises two species, Torodinium robustum and the type species Torodinium teredo. The establishment of Torodinium, as well as the characterization of the majority of its morphology, occurred in 1921 and further advances since have been slow. Lack of research is largely due to its extremely fragile and easily deformed nature, which also renders fossil records implausible. The genus was originally characterized by torsion of the sulcus and a posterior cingulum. Since then, new distinctive features have been discovered including an extremely reduced hyposome, a longitudinally ribbed episome, and a canal on the dextro-lateral side. Further investigation into the function of many anatomical features is still necessary for this genus.

== Etymology ==
The original book in which Torodinium was first named does not explain the meaning of the genus’s name. However, the suffix root “dinium”, commonly used in dinoflagellate naming, is known to be derived from the word “vortex”. The prefix of “toro”, though not confirmed by the original genus identifiers, is likely derived from the Latin root “tort” meaning “wrong” and probably refers to the marked torsion of the sulcus which was first used to identify Torodinium as a distinct and independent genus. Similarly, the etymology of the species T. robustum may be inferred from the Latin word robustum meaning “strong”. This is perhaps referring to the stouter morphology of the species when compared with the longer and more slender type species T. teredo, as this is how Kofoid and Swezy first distinguished the two upon their discovery. The etymology of T. teredo is unknown due to the fact that T. teredo was first named as Gymnodinium teredo in a paper published in 1885.

== History of knowledge ==
Torodinium was first characterized as a distinct genus by Charles A. Kofoid (1865–1947), and Olive Swezy in their 1921 book on unarmoured dinoflagellates. Kofoid and Swezy used silk planktonic nets to collect numerous dinoflagellates from the ocean off the coast of La Jolla, California in the summer of 1921. Prior to this study, species of the Torodinium genus were instead considered Gymnodinium, a relative of Torodinium now classified under their common order, Gymnodiniales. The type species of Torodinium, T. teredo, was originally named as Gymnodinium teredo. Later, Schütt found both species, T. robustum and T. teredo, but classified them as the same species, G. teredo. Although Kofoid and Swezy admit in their paper to have only observed T. teredo, their suspicions as to the existence of T. robustum, inferred from Schütt’s drawings, were later confirmed.

Torodinium was deemed its own genus due to its characteristic sulcal torsion and posterior cingulum housing the longitudinal anterior flagellar pore. While no other member of the Gymnodinium genus had ever been found to have a twisted sulcus, T. teredo had a 0.5 turn marked torsion at the anterior end; similarly, while the anterior flagellar pore in Gymnodinium may be located somewhat posteriorly in some species, it never crosses the midline and certainly never exists as close to the antapex as it does in what is now known to be T. teredo. From this, Torodinium teredo was established as the type species for the new genus Torodinium.

Since its original establishment in 1921, there have been no new species added to the Torodinium genus, though changes in knowledge have certainly occurred in regard to the identification and functionality of various anatomical and morphological features, described in more detail later. Research regarding this is lacking largely due to the extremely delicate nature of the athecate genus and subsequent difficulty observing them with microscopy. Fixing the organism from culture often results in deformities while light microscopy has been found to quickly damage live specimen.

== Habitat and ecology ==
Torodinium is a planktonic marine genus of dinoflagellate, occupying mainly warmer water regions due to its lack of protective thecal plates. The genus is free-living, meaning it does not go through a parasitic phase and instead obtains energy independently. Though previously described as exclusively phototrophic, and containing longitudinal chloroplasts filled with chlorophyll a, the question of whether Torodinium is in fact able to feed or not is up for debate.;) The presence of what appears to be a “feeding veil” (present in other dinoflagellates), as well as multiple accumulation bodies resembling food vacuoles give the impression that Torodinium may be able to feed after all, as well as photosynthesize.

Perhaps most important in lending support to this feeding hypothesis was the discovery of an elongated protuberance extending out from the sulcal-cingular region of the small hyposome. This extension was tentatively termed a peduncle, an organelle used for capturing and reeling in prey in feeding dinoflagellates, and has been found to retract in live Torodinium species under stress. Other Gymnodinioid species have been found to have a similar body extension, although they tend to feed by engulfing prey through the sulcal region of the hyposome. It has been theorized that, due to the very reduced size of their hyposome and posterior localization of the sulcus, Torodinium species are not able to perform this same engulfing technique and instead have to employ the use of this body extension to feed, though this is merely conjecture at the present time. Additionally, the discovery of the lateral canal (discussed further later) has led some researchers to believe that it too has a role in ingestion of particulates. If they are confirmed to be the organelles hypothesized, the combination of the tentatively identified feeding veil, food vacuoles, peduncle, and lateral canal would indicate a possible mixotrophic lifestyle in Torodinium.

Both species of Torodinium are pelagic and are distributed globally, mainly in warmer regions of the open ocean. Below is a list of the places where each of the two species has been found individually and where they have been found together.

Torodinium teredo exclusively	Torodinium robustum exclusively	Both T. teredo and T. robustum
Arctic: Svalbard	Europe: Britain; Helgoland; Netherlands; Portugal	Europe: Baltic Sea; Black Sea; Mediterranean; Scandinavia
Oceania: New Zealand	Asia: Kuwait; Russia	Atlantic Islands: Canary Islands
	South America: Brazil	North America: Mexico

== Physical description ==
=== Morphology and anatomy ===
==== General morphology ====
Species of Torodinium are single-celled organisms with an anterior episome and extremely reduced posterior hyposome, with a posterior cingulum running dorso-ventrally and a sulcus running anterior-posteriorly. They are medium sized protists, with cell lengths ranging from approximately 40-75 μm in T. robustum and approximately 55-100 μm in T. teredo. Though widths vary, T. robustum is generally about 15-25 μm wide while T. teredo is generally about 20-35 μm wide. When the genus was initially described in 1921, the two species were distinguished based on general morphology alone. Individuals with larger, more slender bodies (i.e., a length greater than four times the width) were considered T. teredo and those with shorter, more stout bodies (i.e., a length less than five times the width) were considered T. robustum. This classification has since been updated to include precise cell length measurements as well as the general outline of the cell. The outline of T. teredo appears to have nearly parallel dorsal and ventral sides, with a circular transverse section, while that of T. robustum is widened more in the middle, making its transverse section elliptical. Recent studies have shown that T. robustum is laterally, rather than longitudinally, compressed at the centre, contrary to prior belief. T. teredo also has a larger hyposome and more conspicuous bill-like projection than does T. robustum, although all Torodinium hyposomes are characteristically reduced in comparison with other genera.

As is the case with all genera within the dinoflagellate phylum, Torodinium species all have two flagella; one, the longitudinal flagellum, is quite conventional and whip-like while the second, the transverse flagellum, is somewhat ribbon-like and wavy. It is the waviness of this second characteristic flagellum that gives the dinoflagellates their name, literally “whirling flagella”. The longitudinal flagellum functions as a propeller, oriented posteriorly and pushing the cell in an anterior direction, while the transverse flagellum “steers” the cell, allowing it to rotate and turn. Unlike many other dinoflagellates however, Torodinium are unarmoured, or “naked”, meaning they lack the thecal plates that form armour in other dinoflagellates. This makes Torodinium far more delicate and therefore more difficult to capture and study without compromising their structure, and makes fossil records unobtainable.

==== Sulcus and cingulum ====
In dinoflagellates, the cingulum is a groove that encircles the cell, splitting it into two regions, the anterior episome and the posterior hyposome; the longitudinal flagellum typically lies within this furrow. Similarly, the sulcus is a groove that runs longitudinally and typically contains the transverse flagellum. In Torodinium, both these grooves are extended into the episome, a feature believed to be unique to this genus. Although other genera, including Gymnodinium, Cochlodinium, and Warnowia are already known to possess the anterior extension of the cingulum, the addition of a sulcal extension as well appears to be unique to Torodinium.

One of the first characteristics discovered to separate Torodinium from the genus Gymnodinium was the marked torsion of the sulcus. Rather than forming a relatively symmetrical band down the anterior-posterior axis of the cell, the sulcus appears to twist approximately half a turn at the cell’s apical end in Torodinium, while remaining straight at the antapical end; no such turn exists in Gymnodinium.

Equally important in the establishment of Torodinium as a genus is the posterior cingulum, from which extends the longitudinal flagellum. Contrary to that of Gymnodinium, the flagellar pore, typically anterior, is located very posteriorly in Torodinium, the cingulum extending almost to the antapex. Though some species of Gymnodinium have a cingulum placed back from the anterior end of the cell, none cross the midline as that of Torodinium does.

==== Episome and apex ====
The episome of Torodinium is very large and marked by about 12-14 clearly visible longitudinal ribs running in an anterior-posterior direction, in addition to thinner striations running longitudinally as well. In addition to the anterior extensions of the sulcus and cingulum mentioned above, there exists a third groove on the dextro-lateral side of the episome. The anterior end of this groove terminates between two converging longitudinal ribs, while the posterior end forms a short loop towards the left where it terminates above the anterior cingulum. Previously termed “slender canal” and “anterior pusule”, this groove of unknown function has most recently been deemed the lateral canal and is one of the structures contributing to the theory of possible mixotrophy in Torodinium species.

The apex of the cell is hemispherical and bonnet-shaped, with an apical groove spiralling around the tip 2.5 times in an anti-clockwise direction, and a bill-like protuberance sticking out to point towards either the sinistro-lateral (T. teredo) or dorsal (T. robustum) side of the cell, depending on the species. This protuberance consists of six or seven thin, converging apical ribs, originating from the basis of the apical groove and not connected to the longitudinal ribs that stretch the length of the episome. Historical studies termed these ribs as plastids organized around an oil droplet to form the star-shaped pattern now known to be the result of converging apical ribs. The bill-like projection is currently without a known function but acts as a useful identifier for Torodinium species. The apical groove was originally thought to be present only in T. robustum. However, recent studies employing the use of rDNA sequencing reveal that the presence of the groove in one species and its absence in the other is extremely unlikely owing to their very similar SSU rDNA sequences, so the apical groove is suspected to be present in T. teredo as well.

==== Potential feeding structures ====
In addition to the triangular point emerging from the apex, recent research has also uncovered the presence of a round-tipped body extension protruding from the sulcal-cingular region of the hyposome. This has been hypothesized to be a peduncle, a feeding organelle associated with phagotrophy, and has been found to retract in live species of Torodinium when introduced to environmental stress). A net of hair-like filaments has also been found extending laterally or posteriorly from the cell, depending on the organism, and resembles the “feeding veil” found in other dinoflagellates. Additionally, accumulation bodies have been noted in groups of three in several organisms and tentatively considered to be potential food vacuoles.

==== Cytoplasmic organelles ====
As with all dinoflagellate genera, Torodinium species have a central nucleus and chloroplasts as well as a golgi apparatus and rough and smooth endoplasmic reticulum. Torodinium chloroplasts have been found to stretch longitudinally, clustering close to the side of the cell and tend to be either oblique or transverse in shape when localized in the apex and cingulum. Chlorophyll a has been confirmed to be present but reports on pigmentation are contradictory. A study by Elbrächter found that the chloroplasts were greenish-yellow to pale brown in T. teredo and definitively brown in T. robustum, while Steidinger and Jangen, who worked with Hasle and colleagues on their book, found the opposite. Still others have found scarce pigmentation or green chloroplasts common between both species. These chloroplasts of debatable pigmentation are likely the true identity of the structures originally defined as rhabdosomes, as these were also described as being grouped linearly in rows on the dorsal side of the cell and rhabdosomes have not been reported in future research. The nucleus of Torodinium, located in the centre of the cell, is extremely hard to recognize due to it being nearly see-through. This is caused by the transparent, though thick, chromatin threads spirally twisted inside. Once visualised, the nucleus has been found to be very elongated, approximately eight times as long as it is wide, with a very delicate membrane.

=== Genetics ===
Torodinium DNA has only recently begun to be sequenced as the technology has become available. However, LSU (long subunit) and SSU (short subunit) rDNA sequencing highly support their classifications as species as well as the existence of the clade containing them. Though weakly supported, a close phylogenetic relationship between Torodinium and Katodinium glaucum has also been observed, with the two species containing three identical partial SSU rDNA sequences. This, along with the fact that both K. glaucum and Torodinium specimens feature a post-median positioned cingulum, has been thought to indicate that the two may have a recent common ancestor. However, conflicting research has demonstrated that the two are not taxonomically related and that K. glaucum is not even related to the Katodinium genus at all, instead forming its own new genus, Lebouridinium, with the type species L. glaucum, the status of which is currently taxonomically accepted over K. glaucum. Torodinium SSU and LSU sequences have not been found to cluster with any other unarmored dinoflagellates, indicating that the secondary loss of armour in these groups likely occurred independently rather than in a recent common ancestor.
