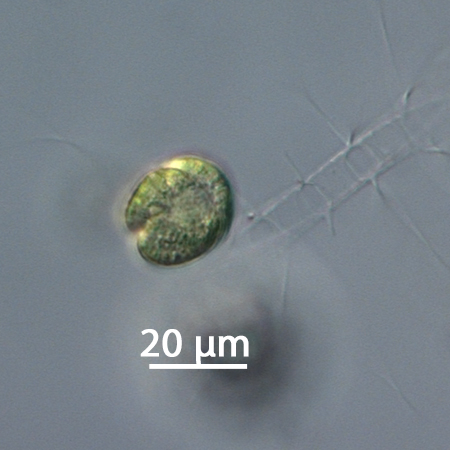
- Lepidodinium chlorophorum

Scientific classification
- Domain: Eukaryota
- Clade: Sar
- Clade: Alveolata
- Division: Dinoflagellata
- Class: Dinophyceae
- Order: Gymnodiniales
- Family: Gymnodiniaceae
- Genus: Lepidodinium; Watanabe, Suda, Inouye, Sawaguchi & Chihara

= Lepidodinium =

Genus of dinoflagellates

Lepidodinium is a genus of dinoflagellates belonging to the family Gymnodiniaceae. Lepidodinium is a genus of green dinoflagellates in the family Gymnodiniales. It contains two different species, Lepidodinium chlorophorum and Lepidodinium viride. They are characterised by their green colour caused by a plastid derived from Pedinophyceae, a green algae group. This plastid has retained chlorophyll a and b, which is significant because it differs from the chlorophyll a and c usually observed in dinoflagellate peridinin plastids. They are the only known dinoflagellate genus to possess plastids derived from green algae. Lepidodinium chlorophorum is known to cause sea blooms, partially off the coast of France, which has dramatic ecological and economic consequences. Lepidodinium produces some of the highest volumes of transparent exopolymer particles of any phytoplankton, which can contribute to bivalve death and the creation of anoxic conditions in blooms, as well as playing an important role in carbon cycling in the ocean.

== Etymology ==
No Etymology is available for Lepidodinium. While not explicitly stated, viride likely refers to the green colour of the organism as it is derived from the Latin word meaning green and is commonly used to name green organisms, for example Asplenium viride, a green fern. The etymology for chlorophorum is also not stated but it seems likely to be derived from the uniqueness of the chloroplast in its acquisition and presence of chlorophyll a and b.

Its type species is Lepidodinium viride.

== History of knowledge ==
Lepidodinium viride was first described in 1987 before being identified as a new genus and named in 1990. The first specimen was obtained from a sample collected from the surface seawaters off the coast of Northern Japan. Its similarity to the genus Gymnodinium was noted but the presence of armoured scales on the cell surface that have never been observed in any Gymnodinium species led to the establishment of the new genus Lepidodinium.

Lepidodinium chlorophorum was first described and initially named as Gymnodinium chlorophorum in 1996. The first specimen obtained off Helgoland, in the North Sea, where its bloom was causing the water to turn green at the surface. Identifying the species that was causing this green discoloration of seawater was initially proved difficult and caused confusion, with several different samples being named Gymnodinium viride on account of their Gymnodinium morphology and green colour.

While the similarity of Gymnodinium chlorophorum to L. viride was noted in the first description of the species, it was initially decided that they were not of the same genus. This was primarily due to the fact one of the characteristic features initially listed for Lepidodinium genus was the presence of plates and none were observed on the chlorophorum species. However following closer analysis of the internal structure of the two species and partial sequencing of the large ribosomal subunit, the genetic similarity between the two species was revealed. Lepidodinium was expanded to include chlorophorum (causing the name change from Gymnodinium chlorophorum to Lepidodinium chlorophorum) in 2007. This genetic sequencing also revealed the relatively high level of similarity between Lepidodinium and Gymnodinium species, leading to the solidification of Lepidodinium as a sister genus to Gymnodinium.

The reclassification of L. chlorophorum led to discussions as to what characteristics could and could not be used to define genera. This discovery of two species with differing scale traits belonging to the same genus challenged the traditional line of thinking that scales are a reliable and important factor in determining dinoflagellate genera. Furthermore, the fact that the plastid acquisition is a shared trait between the two species lends support to the idea that plastid origin might be a more reliable determinate of genera than traditionally thought of. Plastid acquisition was not traditionally thought of as being useful for identifying genera in dinoflagellates due to their particular readiness to take up new plastids, making it a relatively common event within the group. The fact that Lepidodinium is a genus where all species share a plastid in common led to the suggestion that endosymbiont acquisition in dinoflagellates is less frequent than first thought and can be used to usefully classify genera. Today, Lepidodinium chlorophorum and Lepidodinium virdiae are recognised as belonging to the same genus, Lepidodinium, which is a sister genera to Gymnodinium

== Habitat and ecology ==
The presence of chlorophyll b allows L. chlorophorum to cause green seawater discolouration through large sea blooms worldwide that has significant ecological and economic impacts. Within these blooms, their concentration can reach as high as 10^{6} cells L^{−1} (2000 fold higher than outside the bloom) and cover areas of up to 12.95 km^{2}. They have been recorded in Chile, California, Australia, and across Europe. In the Bay of Biscay, France, these blooms have occurred annually since 2007 with increasing abundance, generally between April and August, reaching a peak in the summer. The blooms are associated with high concentrations of ammonia and phosphates, along with transparent exopolymers particles, which results in localised hypoxia in the area. The distribution of these blooms is thought to be primarily driven by the tides.

Lepidodinium is a marine genus that is generally found in subtropical coastal waters and estuaries, and are most prevalent in high salinity, low nutrient, and high temperature waters and irradiance environments. High levels of water stratification also supports the formulation of the blooms, when high densities accumulate at the pycnocline, the depth at which the water density increases rapidly. Significant vertical migration has been observed in L. chlorophorum in association with these blooms.

They are mixotrophic with obligate phototrophy. While they are facultative phagotrophs, they exhibit prey consumption even when photosynthesis is possible and also display selective feeding, preferring high nitrogen prey when the nitrogen:phosphate ratio of the environment is low. This suggests that feeding on prey is an important mechanism for maintaining a normal N : P internally. Their selectivity during feeding is enhanced by increasing temperature, feeding on more high N prey in warmer conditions. This has important ecological implications in association with climate change as ocean temperatures rise.

== Description ==
=== Morphology ===
Lepidodinium are green, oval, dorsoventrally compressed and 20-30 μm in diameter. Flagella emerge from two pores. Cingulum encircles the cell and contains the transverse flagellum. The sulcus, coming from the cingulum, houses the longitudinal flagellum but does not contain the eye-spot, which is unusual for dinoflagellates. Movement occurs though swimming in helical turns. Lepidodinium also contain a ring of polysomes.

Many morphological features of Lepidodinium are typical of dinoflagellates and many are also shared with Gymnodinium. They are unarmoured, have a large, central nucleus, and starch granules are confined to the cytoplasm. Gymnodinium characteristically have nuclear chambers which are observed in L. chlorophorum although it differs in that L. chlorophorum only has one nuclear pore in each chamber, each with a plug. Another shared characteristic of Gymnodinium and Lepidodinium is the nuclear connective fibres between the flagellar apparatus and the nucleus. However, in L. chlorophorum this feature is reduced compared to Gymnodinium species. Lepidodinium also have the curved apical groove in a clockwise direction used to characterise Gymnodinium. Another common feature in dinoflagellates present in Lepidodinium is the presence of a peduncle (characteristic of mixotrophic organisms) located next to the transverse flagellum and associated with a dense body at its base.

L. viride is made morphologically unique by the presence of square scales, reinforced by a complex substructure consistently of arches, subdivided square bases, and smaller rhomboid bases in the centre.

The presence of mucocysts and also ecysis allows L. chlorophorum to excrete Transparent Exopolymer Particles in some of the largest quantities of any phytoplankton, associated with significant ecological impacts. It is thought that this feature helps to facilitate of the formation of L. chlorophorum blooms by contributing to aggregation. L. chlorophorum also excretes a sulphated exopolysaccharide that is mainly composed of galactose, a common component for exopolysaccharides within the dinoflagellates.

=== Plastid ===
The key feature that distinguishes Lepidodinium is the structure of the plastid, due to its unique source of acquisition. Each lens shaped plastid has three appressed thylakoids and interlamellar pyrenoids and is all enclosed by a double membrane envelope. This envelope is enclosed by a further two membranes, between which is filled with ribosomes. The plastid is distinctly green due to it containing chlorophyll a and b but not c, which dinoflagellates typically do possess. It also lacks peridinin, a pigment characteristic of dinoflagellates. The pigments that have been found are neoxanthin, violaxanthin, antheraxanthin, zeaxanthin, lutein, and beta-carotene, which is the typical pigment composition for green algae.

The plastid is most closely related to free-living members of the green algal genus Pedinomonas. Two previously undescribed dinoflagellates ("MGD" and "TGD") contain a closely related plastid that from tertiary endosymbiosis. Although MGD and TGD are known to have nucleomorphs, the observation of a green algal nucleus in Lepidodinium proper remains controversial.

One slight issue in understanding the sequence of evolution is that although the phylogenetic tree built from Lepidodinium-MGD-TGD's plastid is monophyletic, the tree built from their host-nucleus DNA is not, implying that they might have acquired very similar algae independently.

== Life cycles ==
The life cycle of Lepidodinium has not been fully documented. The formation of benthic cysts have been observed in culture but cysts have never been found in sediment in the field. However, Lepidodinium eDNA has been found in a non-bloom period in winter, suggesting a temporary pelagic stage in the life cycles of Lepidodinium. This would allow Lepidodinium to survive in the water column until the appropriate conditions for blooming are generated.

== Genetics ==
Endosymbiotic gene transfer and horizontal gene transfer has occurred to a large extent in the genome of Lepidodinium. It contains codes for proteins with a range of origins creating a mosaic, hybrid proteome. Like other dinoflagellates, Lepidodinium has likely undergone multiple plastid replacement events, with proteins being obtained from these different plastids each time. These plastid replacement events in Lepidodinium include the loss of the secondary, chlorophyll c and peridinin containing plastid from red-algae thought to be the ancestral state that has been maintained in many other dinoflagellates. The Lepidodinium genome still contains plastid-targeting genes originated from this peridinin plastid that now function to target the new green algae plastid. L. chlorophorum possesses the GAPDH which is a plastid-targeted gene originated from a haptophyte, an alga taken up by other dinoflagellates but not currently present in Lepidodinium. Other origins of genes in L. chlorophorum include green algae, heterokonts, streptophytes, and peridinin-containing dinoflagellates. Some genes associated with lineages that have taken up green algae are present in the Lepidodinium genome and not in any other dinoflagellates. It has been suggested that at least three different plastids have led to the development of the Lepidodinium genome, along with horizontal gene transfer from prey. It's been suggested that mixotrophic organisms, such as Lepidodinium, are more susceptible to horizontal gene transfer.

Although not examined in L. viride, L. chlorophorum appears to have a unique N-terminal pre-sequence (thought to be associated with plastid targeting) within the dinoflagellates.

== Plastid acquisition ==
The genetic sequencing of the secondary plastids of Lepidodinium species reveal its origin to be Pedinomonas minor or a species closely related to Pedinomonas, a green algae. Another dinoflagellate species, Pedinomonas noctilucae, is known to take up a Pedinophyte endosymbiont in certain conditions but there is a very low level of integration, compared to the fully integrated plastid in Lepidodinium. This represents one of at least three independent secondary endosymbiosis events involving a green algae in the eukaryotes, the others being in the Euglenophytes and Chlorarachinophytes. The endosymbiont has lost a large number of genes, including those involved in essential functions, showing a high level of integration as an organelle.

== Practical importance ==
The blooms of L. chlorophorum have significant economic and ecological impacts due to the hypoxic conditions the bloom generates. These blooms are also harmful due to their high viscosity which is the result of L. chlorophorum extracellular polymeric substances overproduction. It is reported that this has a negative impact on tourism due to the discolouration the bloom causes, making the seawater appear green and foamy and the advisement against swimming during the blooms. The ecological consequences of these blooms stem from the hypoxic conditions that are generated from biomass recycling, in combination with the increased concentrations of DIP and NH_{4} inside the blooms, also associated with high levels of nutrient recycling. The oxygen concentration in L. chlorophorum blooms is frequently brought below the threshold that most benthic invertebrates can survive, representing just one of the ecological effects of these blooms. For bivalves, the typically observed response to hypoxia is reduced feeding and oxygen consumption, thought to negatively affect their growth and survival. Another factor of these blooms that creates ecological impacts is their high viscosity, caused by the high level of production of extracellular polymeric substances and thought to effect oysters in particular. It is thought that these blooms are becoming more common with climate change as waters become warmer and the elemental composition of seawater alters.

Although the exact mechanism is not known, the presence of L. chlorophorum is correlated with negative effects on oyster (Crassostrea gigas) growth, causing economic harm for oyster farmers. It has been suggested that this is due to L. chlorophorum impairing the filtration ability of C. gigas by producing acid glycoconjugates and transparent exopolymer particles. It also appears that C. gigas has a poor ability to assimilate L. chlorophorum. Both of these mechanisms could explain the observed reduced growth. The problem this causes for farmers is exacerbated by the longevity of L. chlorophorum blooms.

Marine mixotrophic protists such as Lepidodinium play an important role in oceans in terms of nutrient cycling as well as in the food chain. The carbon rich Transparent Exopolymer Particles (TEP) known to be produced by L. chlorophorum are important in the sedimentation of organic matter which enables bacteria abundance. Although many other organisms contribute to this process, L. chlorophorum is particularly important as it produces more TEP than many other organisms, with an average of 380g xanthan equiv [mg chl a] ^{−1} d^{−1} being produced by L. chlorophorum. TEP production in L. chlorophorum also represents a much higher proportion of its carbon intake, with an average of 70% of carbon fixed by photosynthesis and excreted as TEP. During blooms of L. chlorophorum, the TEP concentration can become very high which promotes bacterial activity to the point where anoxic conditions and high levels of organic carbon degradation are created, leading to the ecological impacts.

== Species ==
- Lepidodinium chlorophorum (M.Elbrächter & E.Schnepf) Gert Hansen, Botes & Salas
- Lepidodinium viride M.Watanabe, S.Suda, I.Inouye, T.Sawaguchi & M.Chihara

== Scientific classification ==
Chromista (Kingdom), Harosa (Subkingdom), Alveolata (Infrakingdom), Myzozoa (Phylum), Dinozoa (Subphylum), Dinoflagellata (Infraphylum), Dinophyceae (Class), Gymnodiniales (Order), Gymnodiniaceae (Family), Lepidodinium (Genus)
