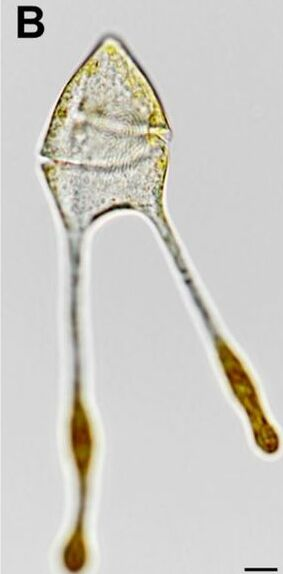
- Ceratoperidinium margalefii

Scientific classification
- Domain: Eukaryota
- Clade: Sar
- Clade: Alveolata
- Division: Dinoflagellata
- Class: Dinophyceae
- Order: Gymnodiniales
- Family: Ceratoperidiniaceae
- Genus: Ceratoperidinium; Margalef ex A.R.Loeblich, III, 1980

Species
- Ceratoperidinium falcatum; Ceratoperidinium margalefii

= Ceratoperidinium =

Genus of single-celled organisms

Ceratoperidinium is a genus of dinoflagellates in the order Gymnodiniales. The genus contains two species. It was first created in 1969 by Margalef, with Ceratoperidinium yeye as the type species. However, because it was not correctly described it was considered invalid, as was C. yeye. In 1980, Lobelich III described the genus as Ceratoperidinium Margalef ex Loeblich III, renaming C. yeye as C. margalefii. In 2014, Gyrodinium falcatum was reassigned to Ceratoperidinium based on genetic analysis.
