= Katodinium =

Scientific classification
- Domain: Eukaryota
- Clade: Sar
- Superphylum: Alveolata
- Phylum: Dinoflagellata
- Class: Dinophyceae
- Order: Gymnodiniales
- Family: Tovelliaceae
- Genus: Katodinium; Fott

Genus of single-celled organisms

Katodinium is a genus of dinoflagellates belonging to the family Tovelliaceae.

The genus was first described by Fott in 1957.

== Species ==
- Katodinium asymmetricum (Massart) A.R.Loeblich, III, 1965
- Katodinium galeatum (W.Conrad) A.R.Loeblich, 1965
- Katodinium nieuportense (Conrad) Fott, 1957
- Katodinium pluristigmatum P.H.Campbell, 1973
- Katodinium redekei (Conrad & Kufferath) Loeblich
- Katodinium ruppiae (Conrad) Loeblich III, 1965
- Katodinium thiophilum (Conrad) A.R.Loeblich, 1965
- Katodinium tubulatum (Rampi) Sournia, 1973
- Katodinium uncinatum (Kufferath) Loeblich, 1965
