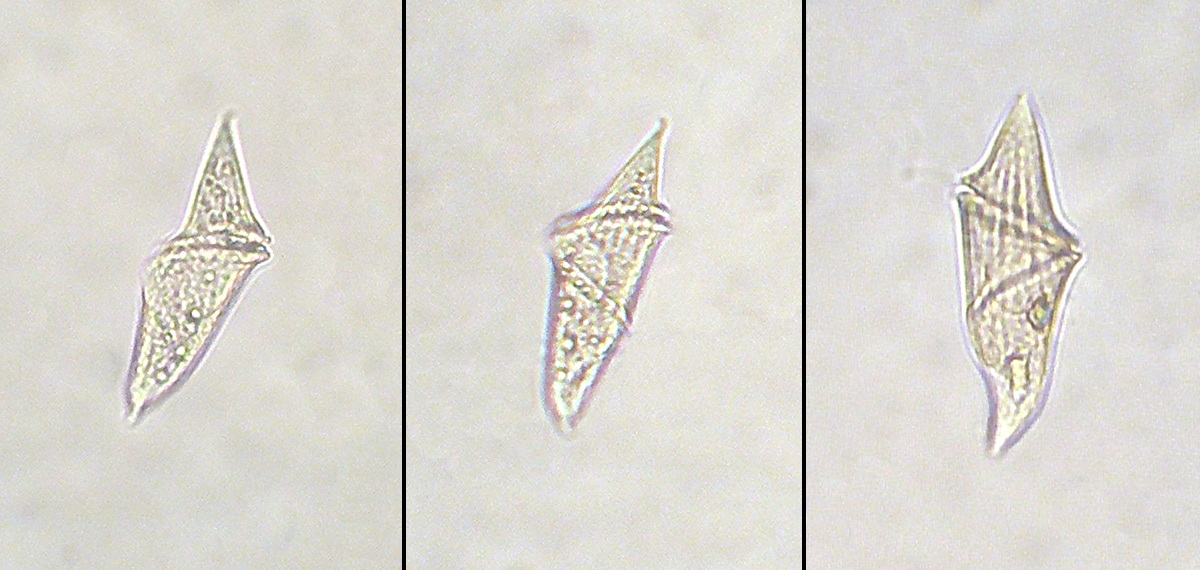
- Gyrodinium spirale Kofoid and Swezy, 1921

Scientific classification
- Domain: Eukaryota
- Clade: Diaphoretickes
- Clade: SAR
- Clade: Alveolata
- Phylum: Myzozoa
- Superclass: Dinoflagellata
- Class: Dinophyceae
- Order: Gymnodiniales
- Family: Gymnodiniaceae
- Genus: Gyrodinium; Kofoid & Swezy, 1921

= Gyrodinium =

Genus of protists

Gyrodinium is a genus of dinoflagellates belonging to the order Gymnodiniales within class Dinophyceae.

The genus has cosmopolitan distribution. World Register of Marine Species lists 141 species, with many synonyms.

They are heterotrophic (cannot produce its own food) and feed on diatoms (such as Chaetoceros debilis) that can be up to 12 times their length. They are 'naked' dinoflagellates, meaning they lack armor (or cellulosic plates).

== Species ==
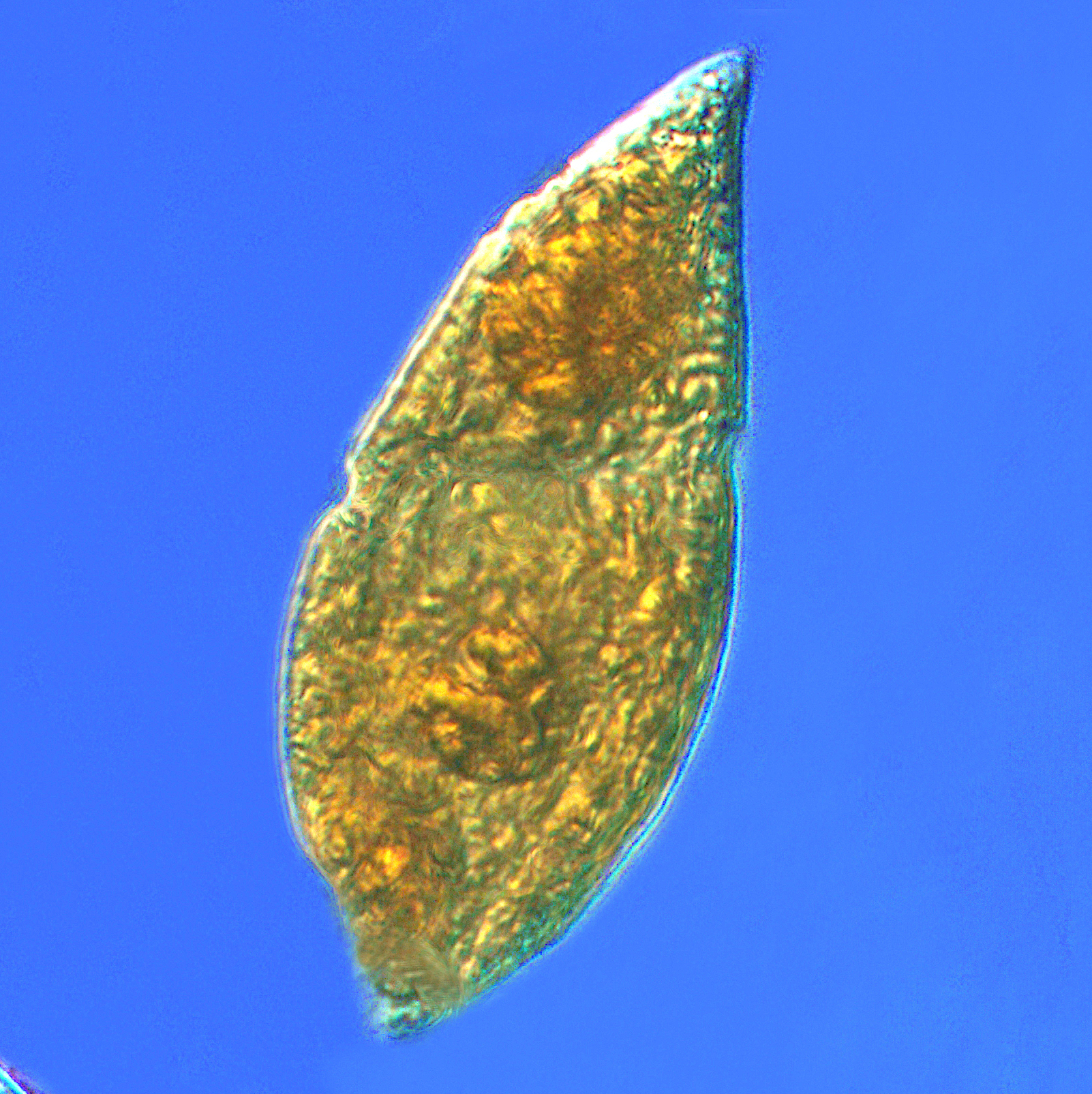
spindle-shaped Gyrodinium dinoflagellate, from the Thau Lagoon of Sète, France

54 species, as accepted by the GBIF:

- Gyrodinium aciculatum
- Gyrodinium ascendans
- Gyrodinium aureum (W.Conrad) J.Schiller
- Gyrodinium britannicum Kof. & Swezy
- Gyrodinium calyptoglyphe Lebour, 1925
- Gyrodinium calyptroglyphe
- Gyrodinium capsulatum
- Gyrodinium carteretensis
- Gyrodinium caudatum Kofoid & Swezy, 1921
- Gyrodinium citrinum
- Gyrodinium cochlea Lebour, 1925
- Gyrodinium complanatum
- Gyrodinium corallinum Kofoid & Swezy
- Gyrodinium crassum (Pouchet) Kofoid & Swezy, 1921
- Gyrodinium dominans Hulburt, 1957
- Gyrodinium estuariale Hulburt, 1957
- Gyrodinium falcatum Kof. & Swezy
- Gyrodinium ferrugineum
- Gyrodinium flagellare Schiller, 1928
- Gyrodinium flavum
- Gyrodinium formosum
- Gyrodinium fusiforme Kofoid & Swezy, 1921
- Gyrodinium fusus (Meunier) Akselman
- Gyrodinium glaebum
- Gyrodinium grave (Meunier) Kofoid & Swezy, 1921
- Gyrodinium grossestriatum
- Gyrodinium helveticum (Penard) Y.Takano & T.Horig.
- Gyrodinium herbaceum Kofoid & Swezy, 1921
- Gyrodinium hyalinum (A.J.Schill.) Kof. & Swezy
- Gyrodinium instriatum Freudenthal & Lee
- Gyrodinium katodiniaescens
- Gyrodinium lachryma (Meunier) Kofoid & Swezy, 1921
- Gyrodinium lacryna
- Gyrodinium lebourae
- Gyrodinium lingulifera Lebour, 1925
- Gyrodinium longum (Lohmann) Kofoid & Swezy, 1921
- Gyrodinium metum
- Gyrodinium mundulum
- Gyrodinium nasutum (A.Wulff) J.Schiller
- Gyrodinium ochraceum Kof. & Swezy
- Gyrodinium pellucidum (A.Wulff) J.Schiller
- Gyrodinium pepo (Schütt) Kofoid & Swezy, 1921
- Gyrodinium pingue (Schütt) Kofoid & Swezy, 1921
- Gyrodinium prunus (A.Wulff) M.Lebour
- Gyrodinium pulchellum
- Gyrodinium pusillum (A.J.Schill.) Kof. & Swezy
- Gyrodinium resplendens Hulburt, 1957
- Gyrodinium spirale (Bergh) Kofoid & Swezy, 1921
- Gyrodinium stratissimum
- Gyrodinium submarinum Kofoid & Swezy, 1921
- Gyrodinium uncatenatum Hulbert, 1957
- Gyrodinium undulans Hulburt
- Gyrodinium varians (A.Wulff) J.Schiller
- Gyrodinium wulffii J.Schill
