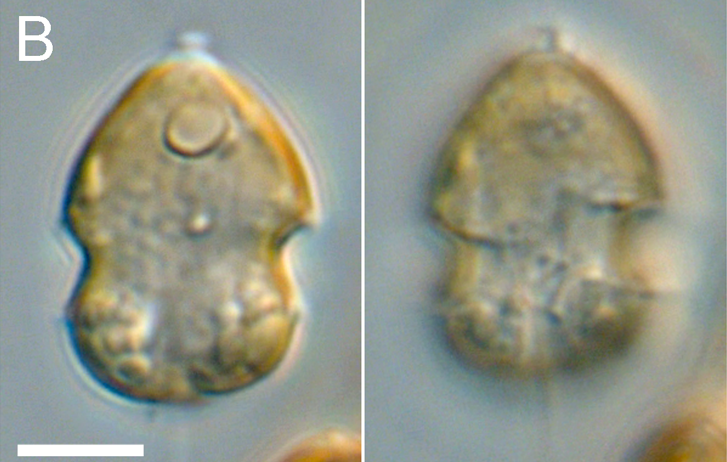
- Azadinium spinosum

Scientific classification
- Domain: Eukaryota
- Clade: Diaphoretickes
- Clade: SAR
- Clade: Alveolata
- Phylum: Myzozoa
- Superclass: Dinoflagellata
- Class: Dinophyceae
- Family: Amphidomataceae
- Genus: Azadinium; Elbrächter & Tillmann

= Azadinium =

Genus of protists

Azadinium is a genus of dinoflagellates belonging to the family Amphidomataceae.

Species:

- Azadinium asperum Tillmann, 2018
- Azadinium caudatum (Halldal) Nézan & Chomérat, 2012
- Azadinium concinnum Tillmann & Nézan, 2014
- Azadinium cuneatum Tillmann & Nézan, 2014
- Azadinium dalianense Zhaohe Luo, Haifeng Gu & Tillmann, 2013
- Azadinium dexteroporum Percopo & Zingone, 2013
- Azadinium galwayense Tillmann & R.Salas, 2021
- Azadinium luciferelloides Tillmann & Akselman, 2016
- Azadinium obesum Tillmann & Elbrächter, 2010
- Azadinium perforatum Tillmann, Wietkamp. & H.Gu, 2019
- Azadinium perfusorium Tillmann & R.Salas, 2021
- Azadinium polongum Tillmann, 2012
- Azadinium poporum Tillmann & Elbrächter, 2011
- Azadinium spinosum Elbrächter & Tillmann, 2009
- Azadinium trinitatum Tillmann & Nézan, 2014
- Azadinium zhuanum Z.Luo, U.Tillmann & H.Gu, 2017
