= Pitelka =

Pitelka is a Czech surname, its female form is Pitelková. Notable people with the surname include:

- Dorothy Riggs Pitelka (1920–1994), American zoologist
- Frank Pitelka (1916–2003), American ornithologist
