= Chelonian (disambiguation) =

Chelonian has multiple, interrelated meanings:

- Chelonia, the order uniting all turtles
- Genus of sea turtle of which the green sea turtle is the only extant member
- The Chelonians, an alien race of humanoid tortoises that appear in the science fiction TV series Doctor Who
- Chelonian Conservation and Biology, International Journal of Turtle and Tortoise Research
- Chelonia, a fictional religious cult in the 2018 video game Red Dead Redemption 2

== See also ==
- Cheloniology, the study of turtles.
