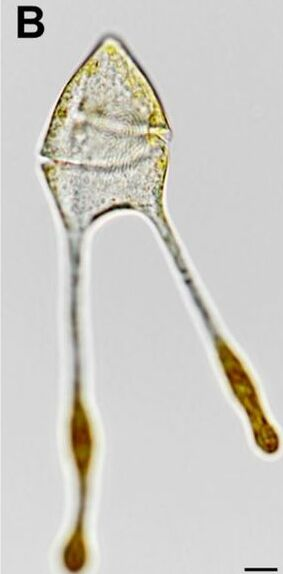
- Ceratoperidinium margalefii

Scientific classification
- Domain: Eukaryota
- Clade: Sar
- Clade: Alveolata
- Phylum: Dinoflagellata
- Class: Dinophyceae
- Order: Gymnodiniales
- Family: Ceratoperidiniaceae; A.R. Loeblich III, 1980

Genera
- Ceratoperidinium; Kirithra; Pseliodinium

= Ceratoperidiniaceae =

Family of single-celled organisms

Ceratoperidiniaceae is a family of unarmored dinoflagellates in the order Gymnodiniales, first described in 2013. The family is named for the first described species, Ceratoperidinium margalefii. Members of the family were found to have morphological similarities, particularly the acrobase structure which was found to be common among the species included in the family. Member species possess chloroplasts.
