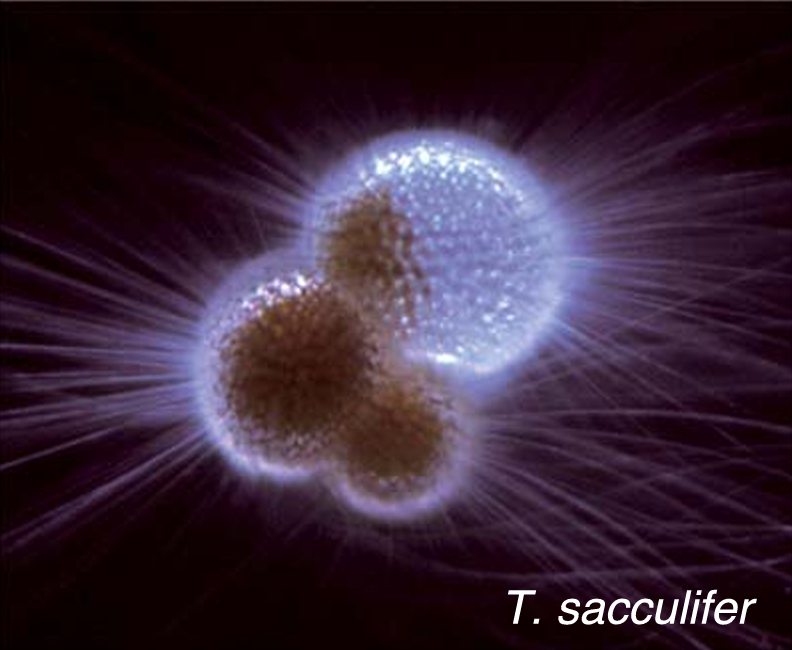

Scientific classification
- Domain: Eukaryota
- Clade: Sar
- Clade: Rhizaria
- Phylum: Foraminifera
- Class: Globothalamea
- Order: Rotaliida
- Family: Globigerinidae
- Genus: Trilobatus
- Species: T. sacculifer

Binomial name
- Trilobatus sacculifer (Brady, 1877)

Synonyms
- Globigerinoides sacculifer; Globigerinoides trilobus; Globigerinoides immaturus; Globigerinoides quadrilobatus

= Trilobatus sacculifer =

Trilobatus sacculifer Temporal range: Late Oligocene – present, 27.3–0 Ma

Species of planktonic Foraminifera

Trilobatus sacculifer is a spinose planktonic foraminiferan belonging to the family Globigerinidae. It is one of the most heavily used species in paleoceanography for reconstructing past sea-surface temperatures and surface-water properties using geochemical proxies such as δ^{18}O, Mg/Ca and boron isotopes. Although it shows considerable morphological variability, including forms with and without a distinctive sac-like final chamber, modern molecular studies indicate that all of these morphotypes belong to a single, genetically homogeneous biological species. Because of its ecological importance, long fossil record and ease of culture in the laboratory, T. sacculifer has become a model organism for studies of symbiosis, calcification, ocean acidification and the marine carbon cycle.

== Morphology and morphotypes ==
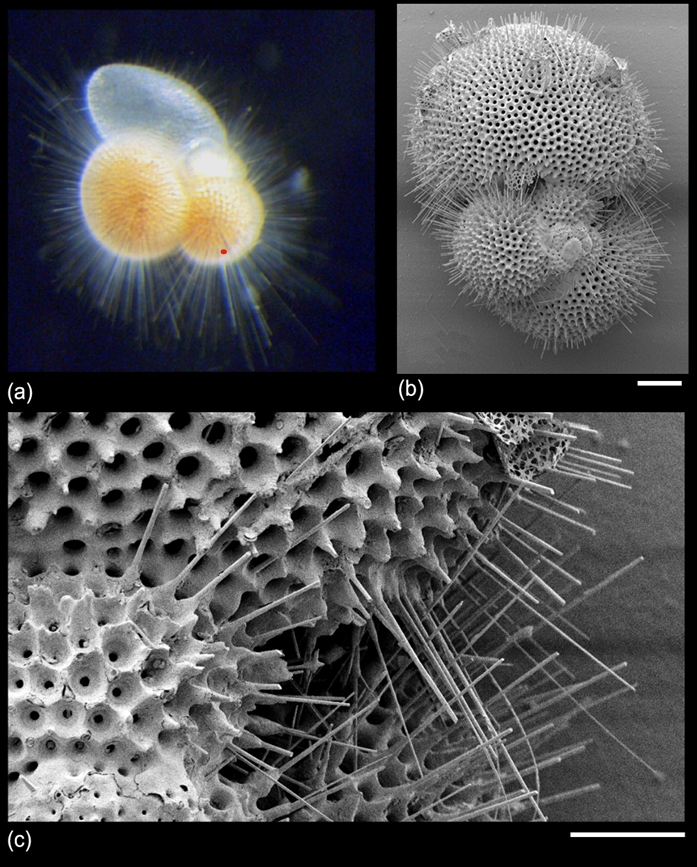
(a) Live specimen of Trilobatus sacculifer; (b) SEM view of test morphology; (c) Close-up of spine bases and wall texture.

Trilobatus sacculifer produces a hyaline, calcareous, multi-chambered test with a trochospiral coiling pattern and spinose, cancellate wall texture. The test typically has three to four globular chambers in the final whorl, with a primary umbilical–extraumbilical aperture and, in many specimens, one or more supplementary apertures on the spiral side. The wall is perforated by relatively large, often hexagonal pores arranged in a honeycomb-like network characteristic of the sacculifer lineage.

Morphologically, the species is highly variable and traditionally subdivided into morphotypes based on the outline and the presence or absence of a sac-like final chamber. Classical morphospecies include: Trilobatus trilobus, Trilobatus sacculifer sensu stricto, T. quadrilobatus, T. immaturus, T. hystricosus. A global genetic survey of all recent morphotypes using SSU rRNA and ribosomal markers found extremely low rDNA variation and no correlation between genetic and morphological differentiation, indicating that this morphological plexus represents a single biological species. For modern samples, current practice is therefore to treat all morphotypes as Trilobatus sacculifer, with informal descriptors such as "with sac" or "without sac" where needed.

In spinose species such as T. sacculifer, long calcite spines protrude from the test surface and are surrounded by a sheath of cytoplasm; these structures increase the effective surface area for gas exchange, symbiont housing and prey capture.

== Taxonomy and nomenclature ==
Trilobatus sacculifer was earlier known as Globigerinoides sacculifer and long placed within the genus Globigerinoides, together with species such as G. ruber and G. conglobatus. Classical taxonomy grouped all Neogene globigeriniform species with supplementary apertures on the spiral side into "Globigerinoides", but combined fossil and molecular evidence later showed that this concept was polyphyletic. A total-evidence phylogenetic study integrating stratigraphic, morphological and small-subunit rDNA data demonstrated that the traditional "Globigerinoides" species fall into at least two independently evolved lineages: a "ruber lineage" (including G. ruber, G. elongatus and G. conglobatus) and a "sacculifer lineage" (including "G." trilobus, "G." sacculifer, Orbulina universa and Sphaeroidinella dehiscens). To avoid polyphyly, Spezzaferri et al. (2015) erected the new genus Trilobatus for the sacculifer lineage, transferring Globigerinoides sacculifer to Trilobatus sacculifer.

== Evolutionary history and fossil record ==
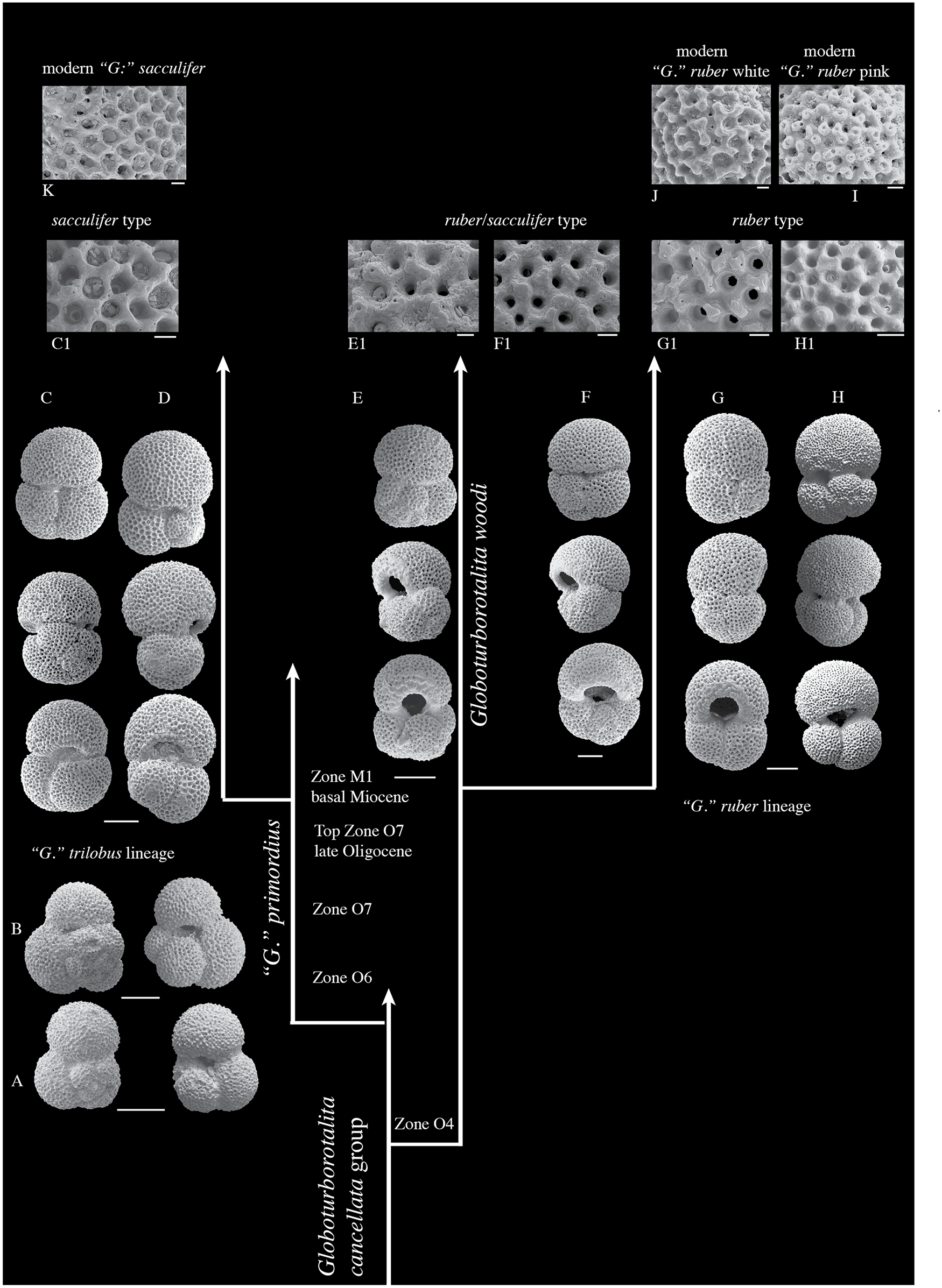
Chronology of the appearance of specimens with supplementary apertures on the spiral side showing the origin of the "G." trilobus and G. ruber lineages from different Globigerinobotalita ancestors at the Oligocene–Miocene transition.

The Trilobatus sacculifer lineage first appears in the late Oligocene, when the earliest forms with supplementary apertures on the spiral side and sacculifer-type cancellate wall texture evolved from Globoturborotalita woodi. These early representatives were historically described as "Globigerinoides primordius" and "G. trilobus". Through the early Miocene, this lineage developed the typical trilobate test and, in younger intervals, the sac-like final chamber that characterises Neogene T. sacculifer sensu lato. Total-evidence phylogenies place Trilobatus as a paraphyletic stem group that gave rise to the genera Praeorbulina and Orbulina, and ultimately to the Neogene spinose genera Sphaeroidinellopsis and Sphaeroidinella. Trilobatus sacculifer persists from the Oligocene to the present, making it one of the longest-ranging spinose planktonic foraminifera and an important element of Neogene–Quaternary biostratigraphy.

== Habitat, ecology, and symbiosis ==
Trilobatus sacculifer is found primarily in tropical and subtropical oceans, usually in the photic zone. As a mixotroph, it supplements heterotrophic feeding on phytoplankton and small particles with photosynthesis performed by its endosymbionts, and it is an important grazer and calcifier within the microzooplankton community.

Trilobatus sacculifer hosts intracellular photosynthetic algal symbionts, typically dinoflagellates, which reside within the host cytoplasm. Recent molecular evidence also shows that the species can harbor the Pelagodinium beii, which performs photosymbiosis within the host. This discovery, reported by Takagi et al. (2024), reveals an independent photosymbiotic acquisition in the Trilobatus lineage. Experimental work using fast repetition rate fluorometry (FRRf) and chlorophyll fluorescence imaging has characterised the spatial distribution and activity of symbionts within individual foraminifera, including T. sacculifer, and documented ontogenetic changes in symbiont density and photosynthetic performance as the shell grows. Comparative phylogenetic studies of symbiont-bearing planktonic foraminifera indicate that photosymbiosis has evolved multiple times and contributed to ecological success and diversification of lineages including Trilobatus.

== Life cycle, reproduction and rhythmicity ==
Individuals grow by sequential addition of chambers in trochospiral arrangement. At reproductive maturity, specimens typically develop a terminal sac-like chamber (in sacculifer morphotypes) and undergo gametogenesis, during which the cytoplasm is converted into numerous biflagellate gametes that are released into the surrounding water. Time-series studies based on plankton tows and sediment trap fluxes have demonstrated that reproduction in T. sacculifer is often synchronised with the lunar cycle, with increased abundances of juveniles appearing in surface waters roughly one week after full moon and distinct lunar-related peaks in shell flux. Such synchrony may enhance gamete encounter rates in the open ocean. Diel vertical migration, with symbiont-bearing individuals residing shallower during the day and slightly deeper at night reflects a trade-off between light harvesting (for the photosymbionts) and predation risk.

== Role in the carbon cycle and ocean acidification ==
By producing calcium carbonate tests, T. sacculifer contributes to the carbonate pump, whereby carbon is converted from dissolved inorganic forms into solid CaCO_{3} and exported to depth when shells sink after death. This process temporarily removes carbon from surface waters and helps regulate surface-ocean alkalinity and CO_{2} levels on seasonal to millennial timescales. As one of the most abundant symbiont-bearing planktonic foraminifera, T. sacculifer is a major contributor to pelagic carbonate flux.

== Culturing and experimental work ==
Trilobatus sacculifer is one of the few symbiont-bearing planktonic foraminifera that can be reliably collected alive and maintained in culture, making it a key experimental species. Early culture studies established basic requirements for temperature, light and food, and documented its ontogeny, test growth and formation of the sac-like final chamber under controlled conditions. More recent experiments have used controlled CO_{2} and pH manipulations to examine how changing carbonate chemistry influences calcification, shell geochemistry and symbiont function. Fluorescence-based imaging techniques applied to cultured T. sacculifer have provided insights into the dynamics of symbiont photosynthesis and host–symbiont interactions over the life cycle. These studies underpin the use of T. sacculifer as a model for understanding broader foraminiferal responses to anthropogenic climate change.

== Paleoceanographic application ==
Because of its broad geographic distribution, and large, strongly calcified test, Trilobatus sacculifer is one of the most widely used planktonic foraminifera in paleoceanography and climate research. Its shell geochemistry, particularly Mg/Ca, δ^{18}O and δ^{11}B, has been extensively calibrated in both culture and field studies, making it a key archive of past sea-surface conditions in tropical and subtropical oceans. Shell Mg/Ca in T. sacculifer is widely used as a proxy for sea-surface and upper-thermocline temperatures. More recent work using modern T. sacculifer from the Atlantic has produced species-specific Mg/Ca and combined Mg/Ca–Sr/Ca calibrations, improving estimates of both temperature and seawater δ^{18}O. Laboratory culture experiments on T. sacculifer have also been used to refine δ^{18}O paleotemperature relationships and to quantify the influence of symbiont photosynthesis and growth rate on stable isotope fractionation.

Trilobatus sacculifer is also one of the key species used to calibrate and apply the boron-isotope (δ^{11}B) proxy for seawater pH and, by extension, atmospheric CO_{2}. Culture experiments on T. sacculifer demonstrated a systematic increase in shell δ^{11}B with increasing seawater pH, providing one of the first empirical calibrations of the δ^{11}B–pH relationship in planktonic foraminifera. These calibrations underpin many subsequent reconstructions of surface-ocean pH and CO_{2} over glacial–interglacial cycles and Cenozoic climate events, where T. sacculifer is often used alongside other symbiont-bearing taxa. Reviews of boron-isotope systematics in foraminifera highlight T. sacculifer as an important "benchmark" species because its δ^{11}B–pH response is relatively well constrained and has been cross-validated between cultures. As a result, δ^{11}B data from T. sacculifer have been widely used to reconstruct changes in surface-ocean carbonate chemistry, ocean acidification, and CO_{2} forcing through time.

In addition to its geochemical uses, T. sacculifer is employed as an ecological and biogeochemical indicator in the modern ocean. Its abundance and depth habitat have been used in studies to characterise tropical and subtropical water masses, thermocline structure and seasonal stratification. Its stratigraphic range spans the late Oligocene to Recent and its morphotypes are relatively well characterised in the fossil record, T. sacculifer (under various historical names) is also used in Neogene biostratigraphy and in the oil and gas industry for correlation and paleoenvironmental interpretation of marine sedimentary sequences.
