= Pelagodinium =

Scientific classification
- Domain: Eukaryota
- Clade: Sar
- Clade: Alveolata
- Phylum: Dinoflagellata
- Class: Dinophyceae
- Order: Gymnodiniales
- Family: Gymnodiniaceae
- Genus: Pelagodinium; Siano, Montresor, Probert & Vargas
- Species: P. bei

Binomial name
- Pelagodinium bei (H.J.Spero) Siano, Montresor, Probert & Vargas

Synonyms
- Gymnodinium bei H.J.Spero; Pelagodinium béii

Species of single-celled organism

Pelagodinium bei is a photosynthetic dinoflagellate that forms a symbiotic relationship with planktonic foraminifera. It is the only species in the genus Pelagodinium.

== Discovery and classification ==
Pelagodinium bei was originally described as Gymnodinium béii by marine isotope geochemist Howard Spero in 1987, after being discovered in the eastern Pacific Ocean. It was redefined as P. bei in 2010 after its Ribosomal RNA was characterized, revealing it to be a relative of the genus Symbiodinium. Symbiodinium is a well-studied endosymbiont of deep water invertebrates, protists and foraminifera, found especially alongside reef-dwelling organisms.

== Ecology ==
Pelagodinium bei contains a single straight elongated apical vesicle with a row of small knobs, eight latitudinal series of amphiesmal vesicles, and a Type E eyespot. When not living as a symbiont the species is able to enter a motile stage.

Pelagodinium bei is hosted by at least four foraminifera: Globigerinoides ruber, G. conglobatus, G. sacculifer and Orbulina universa.

== See also ==
- Globigerina bulloides
