= Oxyphysis =

Scientific classification
- Domain: Eukaryota
- Supergroup: Alveolata
- Division: Dinoflagellata
- Class: Dinophyceae
- Order: Dinophysiales
- Family: Oxyphysaceae
- Genus: Oxyphysis; Kofoid, 1926

Species
- Oxyphysis oxytoides

Genus of single-celled organisms

Oxyphysis is a genus of dinoflagellates.

It includes the species Oxyphysis oxytoides.
