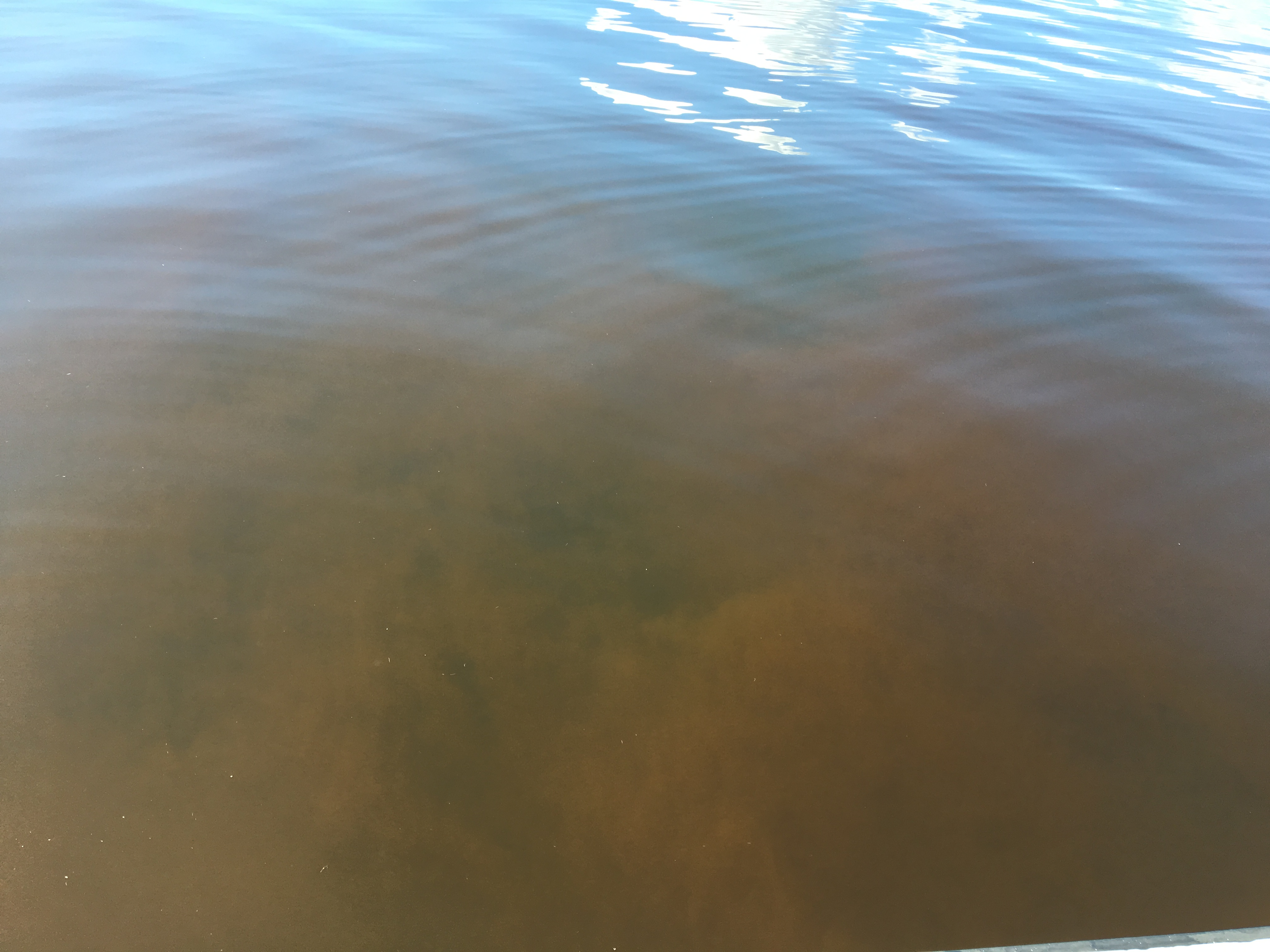
- A Cochlodinium polykrikoides bloom
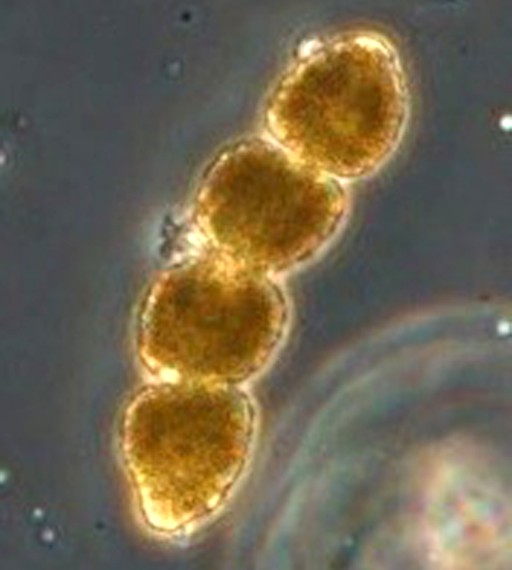
- Micrograph of Cochlodinium polykrikoides

Scientific classification
- Domain: Eukaryota
- Clade: Sar
- Clade: Alveolata
- Division: Dinoflagellata
- Class: Dinophyceae
- Order: Gymnodiniales
- Family: Gymnodiniaceae
- Genus: Cochlodinium; F.Schütt

Type species
- Cochlodinium strangulatum

= Cochlodinium =

Genus of protists

Cochlodinium is a genus of dinoflagellates belonging to the family Gymnodiniaceae. Over the past two decades, harmful algea blooms (HABs) caused by Cochlodinium had occurred more often and expanded from Southeast Asia to regions such as the rest of Asia, North America and Europe.

Due to an absence of molecular data for Cochlodinium, finding out its classification has been challenging for scientist, especially for the type species Cochlodinium strangulatum.

== Species ==
This genus has 40 species total, most of which are heterotrophic:

- Cochlodinium achromaticum Lebour
- Cochlodinium acutum A.Cleve
- Cochlodinium adriaticum (J.Schiller) J.Schiller
- Cochlodinium brandtii
- Cochlodinium convolutum
- Cochlodinium fulvescens
- Cochlodinium geminatum
- Cochlodinium helix
- Cochlodinium pirum
- Cochlodinium pupa
- Cochlodinium polykrikoides
- Cochlodinium strangulatum
