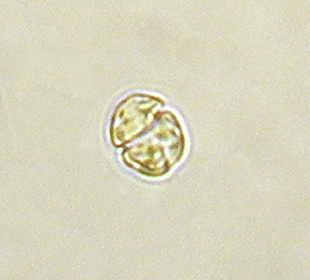

Scientific classification
- Domain: Eukaryota
- Clade: Diaphoretickes
- Clade: SAR
- Clade: Alveolata
- Phylum: Myzozoa
- Superclass: Dinoflagellata
- Class: Dinophyceae
- Order: Gymnodiniales
- Family: Gymnodiniaceae; Lankester, 1885

= Gymnodiniaceae =

Family of protists

Gymnodiniaceae is a family of dinoflagellates belonging to the order Gymnodiniales.

== Genera ==
As accepted by GBIF;

- Akashiwo G.Hansen & Moestrup (1)
- Algidasphaeridium Matsuoka & Bujak, 1988 (3)
- Amphidinium (1)
- Apicoporus Sparmann, Leander & Hoppenrath, 2008 (1)
- Barrufeta N.Sampedro & S.Fraga, 2011 (1)
- Bernardinium Chodat, 1923 (4)
- Cochlodinium Schütt, 1896 (28)
- Filodinium J.Cachon & M.Cachon, 1968 (1)
- Gymnodinium F.Stein, 1878 (308)
- Gyrodinium Kofoid & Swezy, 1921 (55)
- Lebouridinium F.Gómez, H.Takayama, D.Moreira & P.López, 2016 (1)
- Lepidodinium Watanabe, Suda, Inouye, Sawaguchi & Chihara, 1990 (2)
- Levanderina Ø.Moestrup, P.Hakanen, G.Hansen, N.Daugbjerg & M.Ellegaard, 2014 (1)
- Nusuttodinium Y.Takano & T.Horiguichi, 2014 (5)
- Pelagodinium Siano, Montresor, Probert & de Vargas, 2010 (1)
- Plectodinium Biecheler, 1934 (1)
- Pseliodinium Sournia, 1972 (1)
- Schillingia J.Schiller, 1932 (1)
- Sclerodinium Dodge, 1981 (2)
- Spiniferodinium Horiguchi & Chihara, 1987 (2)
- Togula Flo Jorgensen, Murray & Daugbjerg, 2004 (3)
- Torodinium Kofoid & Swezy, 1921 (2)

The number in brackets is the assumed number of species per genus.
