= Harold Kirby (zoologist) =

Botanist (1900–1952)

- Born: February 2, 1900; Tusket, Nova Scotia, Canada
- Died: February 24, 1952 (aged 52)
- Citizenship: American
- Occupations: Zoologist, protistologist, parasitologist
- Years active: 1922–1952
- Title: Vice-Pdt of the Am. Soc. of Parasitol. (1946–1947); Vice-Pdt of the Am. Soc. of Protozool. (1952)
- Spouse: Margaret Thomson Kirby
- Children: 2
- Awards: Guggenheim Fellow (1934); Fellow of Calif. Acad. of Sc. (1947); Delegate of the Am. Soc. of Zool. - Paris (1948)

Harold Kirby, Jr. (2 February 1900, Tusket, Nova Scotia – 24 February 1952) was a Canadian-American zoologist and protistologist, who was the chair of U. C. Berkeley's department of zoology from 1948 to 1952.

Kirby immigrated in 1903 with his family to the United States and became a naturalized citizen in 1933. He received in 1922 his B.S. from Emory University and then in 1923 his M.A. and in 1925 his Ph.D. from U. C. Berkeley. C. A. Kofoid was the advisor for his doctoral dissertation. From 1925 to 1928 Kirby was an instructor in biology at Yale University. At U. C. Berkeley's zoology department, he was from 1928 to 1931 an assistant professor, from 1931 to 1940 an associate professor, and from 1940 until this death a full professor.

Kirby devoted most of his career to the study of protists, specifically those flagellates that live in termite digestive tracts. He worked out a well-documented explanation of the evolutionary history of such flagellates.

Harold Kirby was concerned not only with protozoölogy and parasitology; he was also a naturalist who loved field work. As early as 1925 he made a trip to the Fanning Islands of the Pacific and in that same year published a paper on the bird life of those islands. In the Museum of Vertebrate Zoölogy are to be found good specimens of birds prepared by him. There were trips to Panama, to Europe, and as a Guggenheim Fellow to Africa, Madagascar, and Java.

Kirby was on the editorial staffs of the Journal of Morphology and the Journal of Parasitology and, for several years, was the chair of the editorial board for the University of California Publications in Zoology.

He died unexpectedly from a heart attack while accompanying Boy Scouts on a trip to the Sierras. Upon his death he was survived by his widow (who held a higher degree in zoology), a daughter, and a son.

The professorial chair vacated by Harold Kirby's death was filled in 1953. His successor was William Balamuth, who received his Ph.D. in 1939 with Kirby as thesis advisor and in whose honor the amoebic genus Balamuthia is named. William Balamuth and Dorothy Riggs Pitelka (1920–1994) played an important role in maintaining U. C. Berkeley's strong program in protistology started by Kofoid and Kirby.

== Awards and honors ==
- 1934 — Guggenheim Fellow
- 1946–1947 — Vice-president of the American Society of Parasitologists
- 1947 — elected a Fellow of the California Academy of Sciences
- 1948 — delegate of the American Society of Zoologists at the 13th International Congress of Zoölogy in Paris in 1948
- 1952 — elected vice-president of the American Society of Protozoologists

== Selected publications ==
- Kirby, Harold (June 1945). "The structure of the common intestinal trichomonad of man". The Journal of Parasitology. 31 (3): 163–175. doi:10.2307/3272538. JSTOR 3272538.
- Kirby, Harold (June 1947). "Flagellate and host relationships of trichomonad flagellates". The Journal of Parasitology. 33 (3): 214–228. doi:10.2307/3273552. JSTOR 3273552. PMID 20245738.
- Materials and Methods in the Study of Protozoa. University of California Press. 1950.
