= Henry Baldwin Ward =

American zoologist (1865–1945)

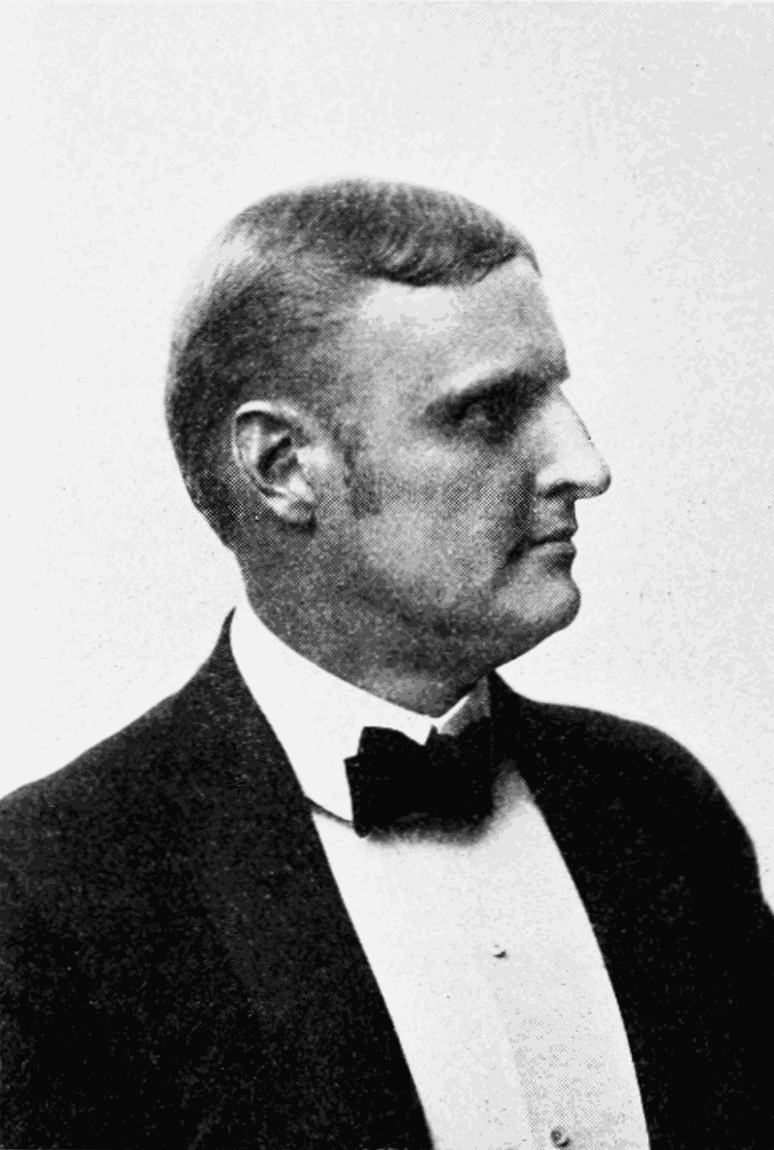
- Born: March 4, 1865; Troy, New York
- Died: November 30, 1945 (aged 80); Champaign, Illinois
- Education: Williams College; Harvard University
- Occupation: Zoologist
- Spouse: Harriet Cecilia Blair (m. 1894)

Henry Baldwin Ward (4 March 1865 – 30 November 1945) was an American zoologist and parasitologist. He was the founder and first president of The American Society of Parasitologists, and founder-editor of the Journal of Parasitology.

== Biography ==
Ward was born on March 4, 1865, in Troy, New York. His father, Richard Halsted Ward, was a professor of biology at the Rensselaer Polytechnic Institute. He got his bachelor's degree from Williams College of Williamstown, Massachusetts, in 1885. He became an instructor of Science at Troy High School, where he served from 1886 to 1888. For two years, from 1888 to 1980, he participated in postgraduate study in European universities in cities like Göttingen, Freiburg, and Leipzig, and in biological facilities at Naples, Heligoland, and Villefranche-sur-Mer. He got his Ph.D. from Harvard University in 1892.

He accepted a job as Instructor of Morphology at the University of Michigan in 1892. Next year, he got a job as an Associate Professor of Zoology at the University of Nebraska. In 1893, the Michigan Fish Commission commissioned him to study the sources of food for fish in the Traverse Bay area due in part to the decline in commercial fishing industry in Northern Michigan. Ward got promoted to a professor in 1899. Three years later he became a dean of the College of Medicine. In 1909 he was named Professor of Zoology at the University of Illinois, where he got his Emeritus Professor title in 1933. He remained there until his death at his home in Champaign on November 30, 1945.

Besides his zoology work, Ward also made contributions to phycology and parasitology. He founded the Journal of Parasitology in 1914, and was the first president of The American Society of Parasitologists (ASP). The Ward Medal of the ASP, established in 1959, is named in his honor. He was permanent secretary of the American Association for the Advancement of Science from 1933 to 1937, continuing as its executive committee member till 1941.

He married Harriet Cecilia Blair on September 11, 1894, and they had two children.

A prominent conservationist, he was president of the Izaak Walton League from 1928 to 1929.
