= Azaspiracid =

Azaspiracid-1
- Chemical structure of Azaspiracid

Identifiers
CAS Number	214899-21-5
3D model (JSmol)	Interactive image
Abbreviations	AZA
ChemSpider	29783960
PubChem CID	11285911
UNII	L7T6T5J56J
- InChI: InChI=1S/C47H71NO12/c1-26-18-36-41-38(24-45(58-41)30(5)17-27(2)25-48-45)56-44(22-26,55-36)23-29(4)40-28(3)19-32(7)47(52,59-40)42(51)37-21-35-34(53-37)20-31(6)46(57-35)16-15-43(60-46)14-10-12-33(54-43)11-8-9-13-39(49)50/h8,10-12,26-28,30-38,40-42,48,51-52H,4,9,13-25H2,1-3,5-7H3,(H,49,50)/b11-8+/t26-,27+,28-,30-,31+,32+,33+,34+,35+,36+,37-,38+,40-,41+,42+,43-,44-,45-,46+,47+/m1/s1 Key: BVZWTQCTAVYACS-LHNLHZPZSA-N; InChI=1S/C47H71NO12/c1-26-18-36-41-38(24-45(58-41)30(5)17-27(2)25-48-45)56-44(22-26,55-36)23-29(4)40-28(3)19-32(7)47(52,59-40)42(51)37-21-35-34(53-37)20-31(6)46(57-35)16-15-43(60-46)14-10-12-33(54-43)11-8-9-13-39(49)50/h8,10-12,26-28,30-38,40-42,48,51-52H,4,9,13-25H2,1-3,5-7H3,(H,49,50)/b11-8+/t26-,27+,28-,30-,31+,32+,33+,34+,35+,36?,37-,38+,40-,41+,42-,43-,44-,45-,46+,47+/m0/s1 Key: BVZWTQCTAVYACS-KMOFIGAKSA-N
- SMILES: C[C@@H]1C[C@H]2[C@H]3[C@H](C[C@@]4(O3)[C@@H](C[C@@H](CN4)C)C)O[C@@](C1)(O2)CC(=C)[C@H]5[C@@H](C[C@@H]([C@](O5)([C@H]([C@H]6C[C@H]7[C@@H](O6)C[C@@H]([C@]8(O7)CC[C@]9(O8)CC=C[C@@H](O9)/C=C/CCC(=O)O)C)O)O)C)C

Properties
Chemical formula	C_{47}H_{71}NO_{12}
Molar mass	842.07 g mol^{-1}
Appearance	Colorless
- Except where otherwise noted, data are given for materials in their standard state (at 25 °C [77 °F], 100 kPa). Infobox references

Azaspiracids (AZA) are a group of polycyclic ether marine algal toxins produced by the small dinoflagellate Azadinium spinosum that can accumulate in shellfish and thereby cause illness in humans.

Azaspiracid was first identified in the 1990s following an outbreak of human illness in the Netherlands that was associated with ingestion of contaminated shellfish originating from Killary Harbour, Ireland. To date, over 20 AZA analogues have been identified in phytoplankton and shellfish. Over the last 15 years, AZAs have been reported in shellfish from many coastal regions of western Europe, Northern Africa, South America, and North America. In addition, AZAs have been found in Japanese sponges and Scandinavian crabs. Not surprisingly, the global distribution of AZAs appears to correspond to the apparent wide spread occurrence of Azadinium. Empirical evidence is now available that unambiguously demonstrates the accumulation of AZAs in shellfish via direct feeding on AZA-producing A. spinosum.

== Mechanism of action ==
Azaspiracid is a phycotoxin that inhibits hERG voltage-gated potassium channels.

== Human Illness ==
Unlike many other marine phycotoxins, little is known about the AZA toxin class. Similar to DSP toxins, human consumption of AZA-contaminated shellfish can result in severe acute symptoms that include nausea, vomiting, diarrhea, and stomach cramps. Azaspiracid has an EU and FDA established regulatory limit of 160 μg/kg.

To date, six human azaspiracid poisoning (AZP) events have been confirmed, but it is quite possible, due to the similarity of symptoms observed for people with DSP or other types of food poisoning (e.g., bacterial enteritis), that many more undocumented events have occurred. Coincidentally, each of the confirmed AZP events have been traced to contaminated Irish shellfish (Mytilus edulis).

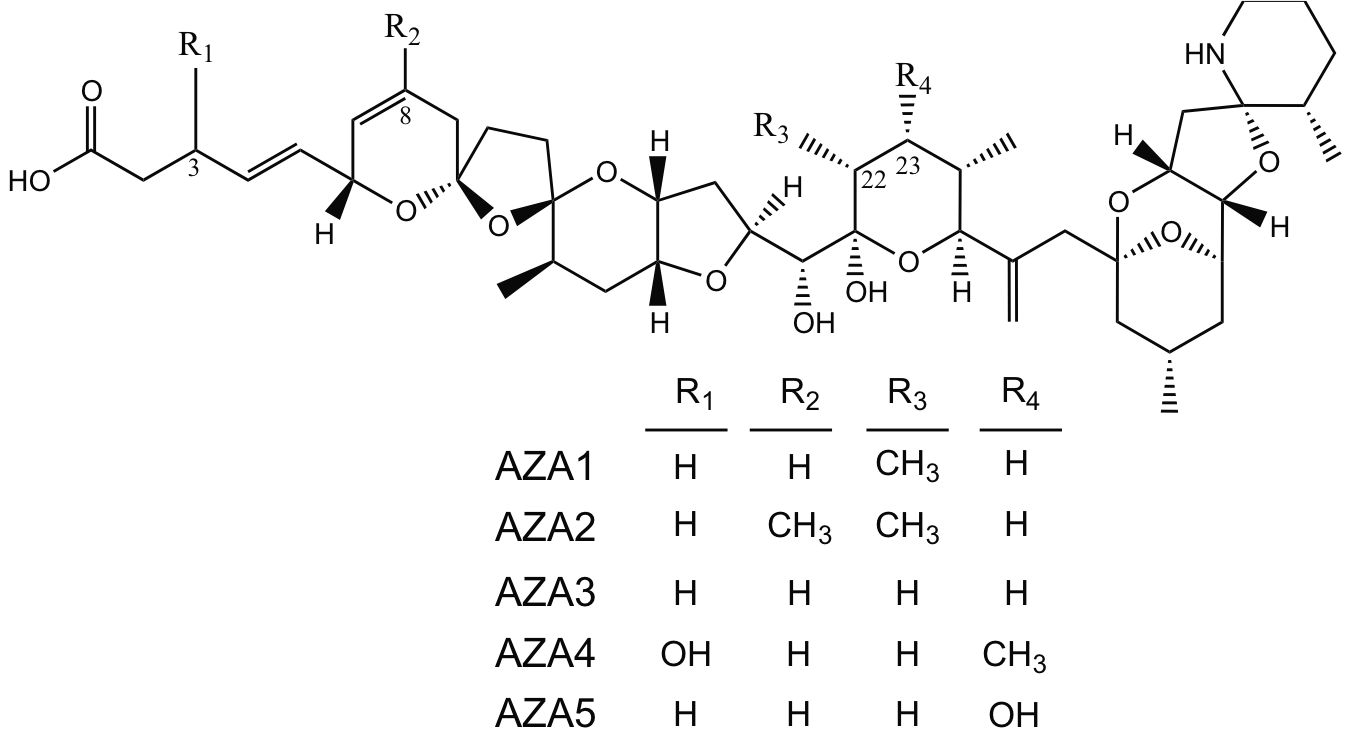
Analogues of Azaspiracid

The first confirmed AZP event occurred in November 1995. Mussels harvested from Killary Harbour, Ireland were exported to The Netherlands, resulting in eight people falling ill with DSP-like symptoms of gastrointestinal illness, including nausea, vomiting, severe diarrhea, and stomach cramps. The absence of known DSP toxins okadaic acid and dinophysistoxin-2 led to the discovery and identification of a novel etiological agent, temporarily called Killary Toxin-3 before being renamed to AZA1. Mussels collected from the same area five months after the event were shown to contain (in μg/g whole meat) AZA1 (1.14), AZA2 (0.23), and AZA3 (0.06).

In September/October 1997, as few as 10-12 AZA-contaminated mussels were consumed by individuals in the Arranmore Island region of Donegal, Ireland. At least 20-24 people were believed to have been exposed to AZAs in this event, but only eight sought medical attention. Symptoms included nausea, vomiting, and diarrhea for 2–5 days prior to full recovery. Analysis of the shellfish revealed five AZA analogues, AZA1-5, with most of the toxin concentrated in the digestive glands at levels exceeding 30 μg/g (estimated at 6 μg/g whole mussel meat). The AZAs persisted in the mussels at elevated levels for at least eight months.

In September 1998, mussels exported from Clew Bay, Ireland to Ravenna, Italy were consumed and ten people fell victim to AZP with typical gastrointestinal symptoms. Digestive glands were shown to contain ~1 μg/g AZAtotal with three AZA analogues present (in μg/g digestive gland): AZA1 (0.5), AZA2 (0.06), and AZA3 (0.44).

Also in September 1998, a large shipment of mussels from Bantry Bay, Ireland was sent to France, resulting in an estimated 20-30 human illnesses due to AZP. Ironically, these shellfish has been tested ahead of time and deemed safe according to the DSP mouse bioassay; however, it was later determined that the DSP mouse bioassay is susceptible to false negatives for the AZA toxins. Coincidentally, the French government posed an embargo on the import of Irish shellfish for most of 1999. Follow-up analysis of the shellfish by LC/MS determined that high levels of AZA were present (up to 1.5 μg/g whole meat).

In August 2000, between 12-16 people from various regions (Warrington, Alyesbury, Isle of Wight, Sheffield) of the United Kingdom were intoxicated following the consumption of frozen, pre-cooked mussels that originated from Bantry Bay, Ireland. Symptoms included nausea, diarrhea, abdominal pain, and cramps. These mussels were also deemed safe for human consumption based on results from mouse bioassays; however, LC/MS analysis determined the presence of AZA1-3 in an uneaten portion from this same batch. Toxin concentrations were 0.85 μg/g shellfish meat (not including the digestive gland), which likely represented an underestimation of the total concentration.

In 2008, an AZP event occurred in the United States in July. Frozen, pre-cooked mussels from Bantry Bay, Ireland were exported and intoxicated two people. It is estimated that each person ate between 113 and 340 grams of shellfish. Within five hours following the meal, each person experienced abdominal heaviness, vomiting (5-15 times), and diarrhea for up to 30 hours. Analysis of similar products with the same lot number revealed the presence of AZA1-3 with up to 0.244 μg AZAtotal/g tissue. As a result of this event, over 150 tonnes of commercial product were removed from the market and voluntarily destroyed by the manufacturer.

== Chemistry ==
The general structure of AZA1 (MW 841.5) was first reported in 1998 after successful isolation from Irish blue mussel (Mytilus edulis) material. A cyclic amine (or aza group), a unique tri-spiro-assembly and a carboxylic acid group gave rise to the name AZA-SPIR-ACID. The original structure reported in 1998 was found to contain several errors, first indicted by an empirical demonstration of the contra-thermodynamic configurational assignment of the relative configuration at the C13 ketal center, and followed by attempts carried out in 2003. The purported synthesized AZA1 structure was found to have a different chromatographic behavior and discrepancies in its nuclear magnetic resonance (NMR) spectrum compared to the compound isolated from natural sources. Further extensive study including sophisticated synthetic chemistry resulted in structure revision in 2004. In 2018, a comprehensive synthetic and analytical study was published that provided a structural revision that corrects all previous published azaspiracid structural assignments. Specifically, the primary azaspiracids were assigned the (6R,10R,13R,14R,16R,17R,19S,20S,21R,24S,25S,28S,30S,32R,33R,34R,36S,37S,39R)-absolute configurations. Thus, the structures of azaspiracids presented on this Wikipedia page should also be revised to reflect the 20S absolute configuration.
