= Allen Press =

American academic publisher (1935–2023)

- Founded: 1935
- Founder: Harold Allen
- Country of origin: United States
- Headquarters location: Lawrence, Kansas
- Publication types: Academic journals, books
- Official website: www.allenpress.com

Allen Press was a printer and publisher of scientific, academic and scholarly journals as well as commercial trade publications. Founded by Harold Allen in 1935, the company was located in Lawrence, Kansas from its founding 1935 until October, 2023. Minnesota-based company, CJK Group purchased Allen Press in early 2023.

== Journals ==
It was the publisher, amongst others, of the Journal of Parasitology (American Society of Parasitologists), Phycologia (International Phycological Society), and the Proceedings of the Biological Society of Washington (Biological Society of Washington). Many of the DOIs generated by Allen Press no longer work.
