= Chelonian Conservation and Biology =

- Discipline: Herpetology
- Language: English
- Edited by: Anders G.J. Rhodin, Jeffrey A. Seminoff

Publication details
- History: 1993-present
- Publisher: Allen Press on behalf of the Chelonian Research Foundation
- Frequency: Biannually

Standard abbreviations
- ISO 4: Chelonian Conserv. Biol.

Indexing
- CODEN: CCOBED
- ISSN: 1071-8443
- LCCN: 94645031
- OCLC no.: 298955857

Links
- Journal homepage; Online archive; Journal page at publisher's website

Chelonian Conservation and Biology: International Journal of Turtle and Tortoise Research is a peer-reviewed scientific journal covering research on freshwater turtles, marine turtles, and tortoises (Order Testudines). It was established in 1993 by the Chelonian Research Foundation as the new scientific journal of the IUCN Species Survival Commission's Tortoise and Freshwater Turtle Specialist Group and the International Bulletin of Chelonian Research. The journal was first published with support from Conservation International, the Chelonian Institute, the Wildlife Conservation Society, the Florida Audubon Society, and the Species Survival Commission of the World Conservation Union.

Since 2006, the journal has been published in collaboration with Allen Press Publishing Services. The first editors-in-chief were John L. Behler, Peter C. H. Pritchard, and Anders G. J. Rhodin. Rhodin has been one of the editors ever since, first with Pritchard and currently with Jeffrey A. Seminoff.
