= American Society of Parasitologists =

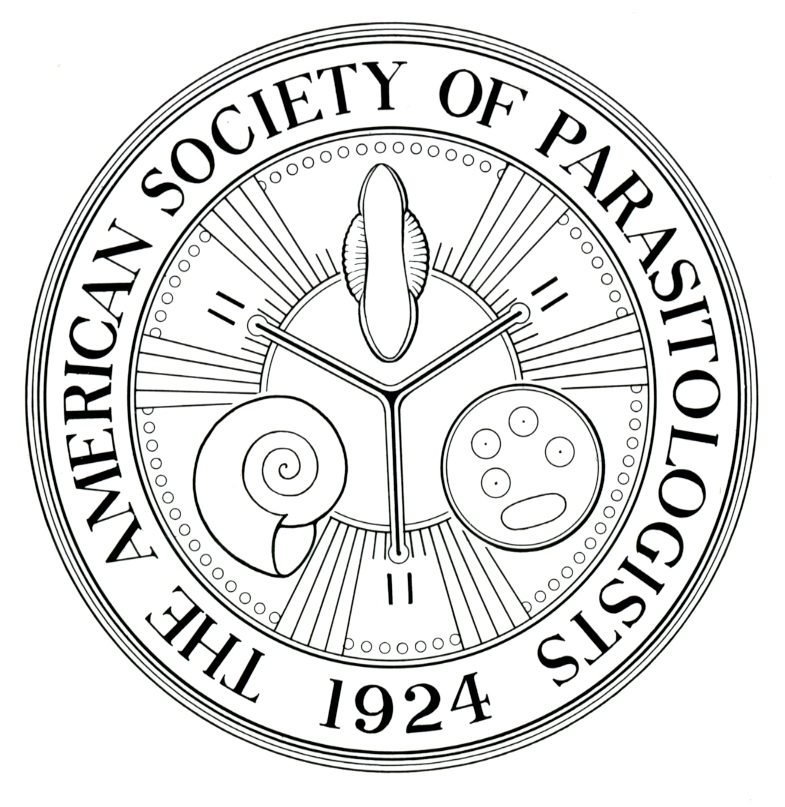
- Formation: December 30, 1924; 101 years ago
- Founder: William Walter Cort and Henry Baldwin Ward
- Founded at: Washington, DC
- Type: 501(c)(3) not-for-profit membership corporation
- Members: 515 (2025)
- President: Sara Brant
- President-Elect: Anindo Choudhury
- Vice President: Kelly Weinersmith
- Immediate Past-President: Reginald Blaylock
- Subsidiaries: Annual Midwestern Conference of Parasitologists (AMCOP), The Helminthological Society of Washington (HELMSOC), Northern California Parasitologists (NCP), New England Association of Parasitologists (NEAP), Rocky Mountain Conference of Parasitologists (RMCP), Southern California Society of Parasitologists (SCSP), Southeastern Society of Parasitologists (SSP), and Southwestern Association of Parasitologists (SWAP)
- Website: amsocparasit.org

Founded in 1924, the American Society of Parasitologists comprises a diverse group of about 500 scientists from academia, industry, and government involved in the study and teaching of the scientific discipline of parasitology. Society members contribute to the development of parasitology as a discipline, as well as to primary research in behavior, biochemistry, ecology, immunology, medicine, molecular biology, physiology, systematics, and other related fields of science.

Notable members of the society include William C. Campbell, who was awarded the Nobel Prize in Physiology or Medicine in 2015.

The Mission of the American Society of Parasitologists is to constantly improve understanding of parasites, parasitic diseases, and parasitism on a global basis and to disseminate this knowledge worldwide. This mission is achieved by providing opportunities for all scientists to publish their original findings in the Society's bimonthly peer-reviewed scientific journal, the Journal of Parasitology., and to present and discuss new information at the Society's annual meeting, in the ASP's Newsletter, through the ASP's Public Advocacy Network, or in discussion groups on the internet. ASP aims to educate parasitologists via their Web Page and other educational media produced by the Society. To meet the goal of remaining a strong focus of scientific exchange across the broad discipline of parasitology, ASP actively seeks and supports new research areas and new members, and strives to retain current members, as well as encourage and support the continued existence of highly specialized areas of research in parasitology.

Recognizing that parasitism is the most common form of existence, and that parasites and the diseases they can cause affect the health, development, and evolution of free-living animals and plants, the American Society of Parasitologists seeks to foster the advancement of knowledge in all areas of parasitism. Understanding the value of this knowledge and the responsibility given to the ASP as a result of understanding parasitism, the ASP seeks to disseminate this knowledge to all who have need of it through outreach programs with educational systems, governmental, public, and private agencies, as well as during scientific meetings. To do this, ASP is dedicated to the perpetuation of all areas of the discipline that is parasitology.

The American Society of Parasitologists is supported by 8 regional affiliates: Annual Midwestern Conference of Parasitologists (AMCOP), The Helminthological Society of Washington (HELMSOC), Northern California Parasitologists (NCP) , New England Association of Parasitologists (NEAP), Rocky Mountain Conference of Parasitologists (RMCP), Southern California Society of Parasitologists (SCSP), Southeastern Society of Parasitologists (SSP), and Southwestern Association of Parasitologists (SWAP). Each affiliate has its own members, leadership structure, and holds their own annual meetings.

The next ASP meeting will be held from July 20 to 29, 2026 in Orlando, FL.
