= Dorothy Riggs Pitelka =

American zoologist, protistologist and cancer researcher

Dorothy Riggs Pitelka (born Dorothy Getchell Riggs, 13 September 1920 – 6 February 1994) was an American zoologist, protistologist, cancer researcher, and pioneer in applications of electron microscopy to zoology and protistology, known for her 1963 book Electron-Microscopic Structure of Protozoa.

== Biography ==
She was born in Merzifon, Turkey, where her father was the business manager of a missionary school. (Her father was a great-great-great-grandson (3x-grandson) of Zebulon Riggs (1719–1780), who was one of the first inhabitants of Mendham Township, New Jersey.) When she was three years old, the family returned from Turkey to the United States. They eventually settled in Denver, Colorado. She received in 1941 her bachelor's degree in zoology from the University of Colorado Boulder. With the aid of a teaching assistantship and a research fellowship, she became a graduate student in zoology at UC Berkeley and in February 1943 married a fellow graduate student Frank Pitelka. The birth of their first child delayed Dorothy Pitelka’s progress toward a Ph.D., which she received in 1948 under the supervision of Harold Kirby. Her research for the dissertation involved the study of protozoan flagella by means of an electron microscope. She was one of the first electron microscopists at Berkeley.

Most of Pitelka's scientific career was devoted to research on mammary-gland cells as a member of UC Berkeley's Cancer Research Laboratory. She investigated the fine structure of normal, precancerous breast cells under various physiological conditions. She was the first person to discover a low-virulent form of the mouse mammary tumor virus and to demonstrate that the virus can be transmitted congenitally. Together with her student Joanne Emmerman, Pitelka developed a procedure for growing fully active breast cells in culture.

In 1967–1968 Dorothy Pitelka was the president of the International Society of Protozoologists (later renamed the International Society of Protistologists). From 1971 to 1984 she was an adjunct professor of biology at UC Berkeley.

She died in the Sutter Oaks Alzheimer's Center in Sacramento, California. She was survived by her husband, two sons, Louis Pitelka and Wenzel (aka "Vince") Pitelka, one daughter, Kazi Pitelka, five grandchildren, and four great-grandchildren. Louis is retired after a career as a professor of botany, a plant ecologist, and climate scientist. Wenzel is retired after a career as a professor of art and a ceramic artist. Kazi is retired after a career as a concert violinist and principal violist for the Los Angeles Opera.
