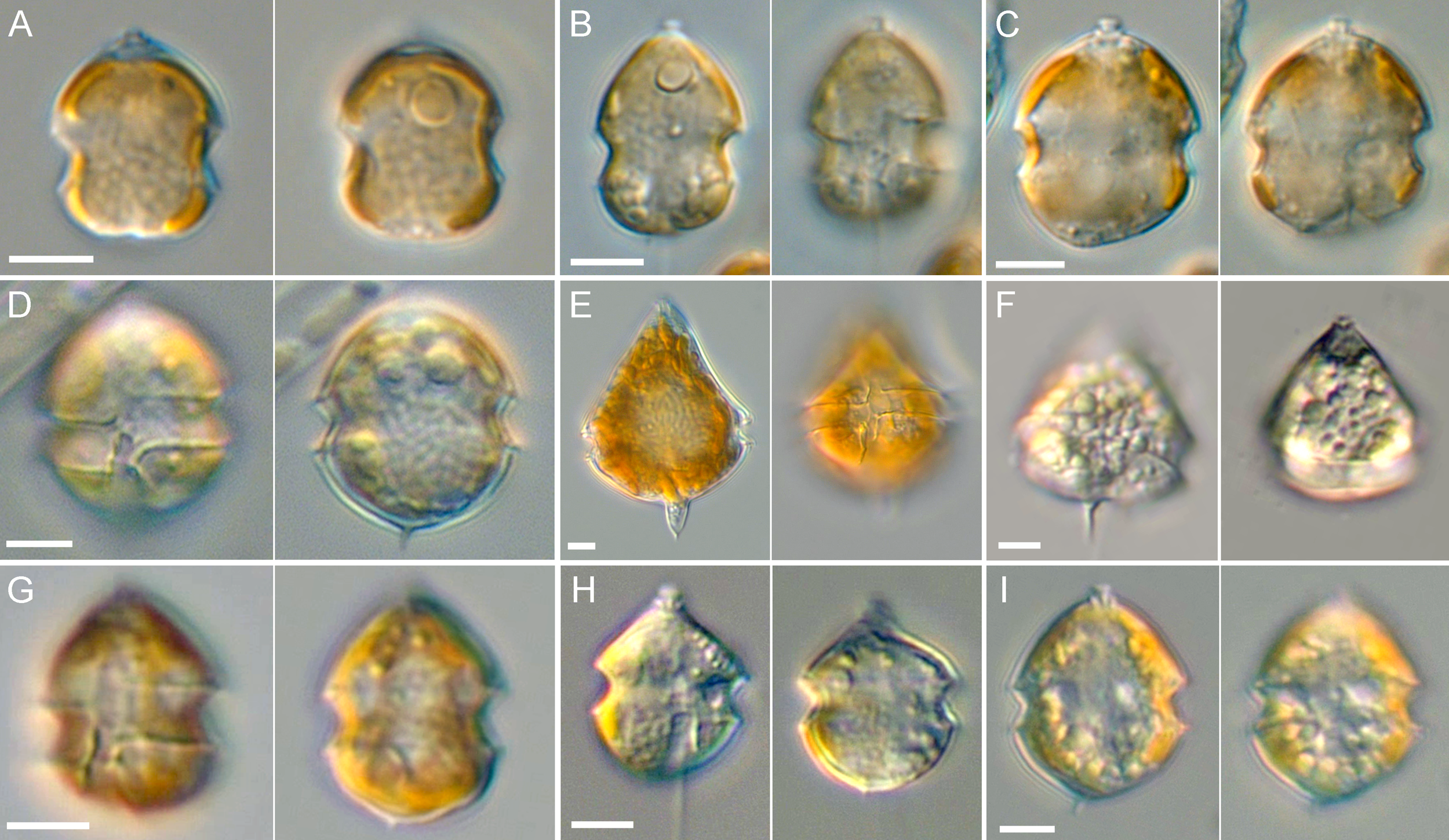
- Gallery of Amphidomataceae

Scientific classification
- Domain: Eukaryota
- Clade: Diaphoretickes
- Clade: SAR
- Clade: Alveolata
- Phylum: Myzozoa
- Superclass: Dinoflagellata
- Class: Dinophyceae
- Family: Amphidomataceae; Sournia, 1984

= Amphidomataceae =

Family of protists

Amphidomataceae is a family of dinoflagellates belonging to the class Dinophyceae, order unknown.

Genera:

- Amphidoma
- Azadinium
