= Charles Atwood Kofoid =

American zoologist (1865–1947)

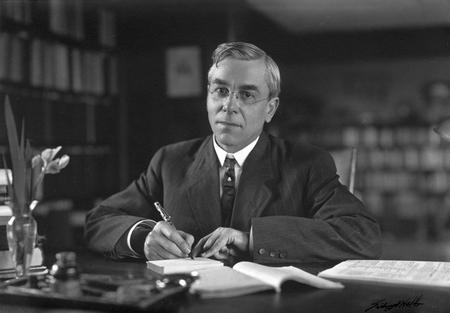
- Born: October 11, 1865; Granville, Illinois, U.S.
- Died: May 30, 1947 (aged 81); Berkeley, California, U.S.
- Education: Harvard University
- Known for: Marine biology
- Scientific career
- Fields: Zoology
- Notable students: S. F. Light, Harold Kirby

Signature
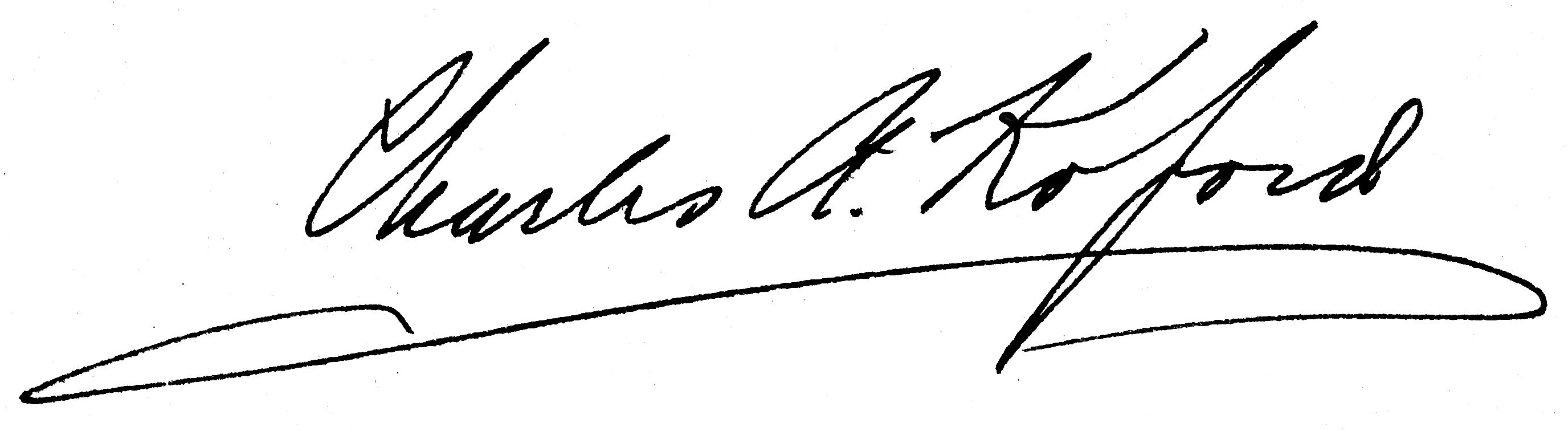

Charles Atwood Kofoid (11 October 1865 – 30 May 1947) was an American zoologist known for his collection and classification of many new species of marine protozoans which established marine biology on a systematic basis.

Kofoid also wrote a volume on the biological stations of Europe.

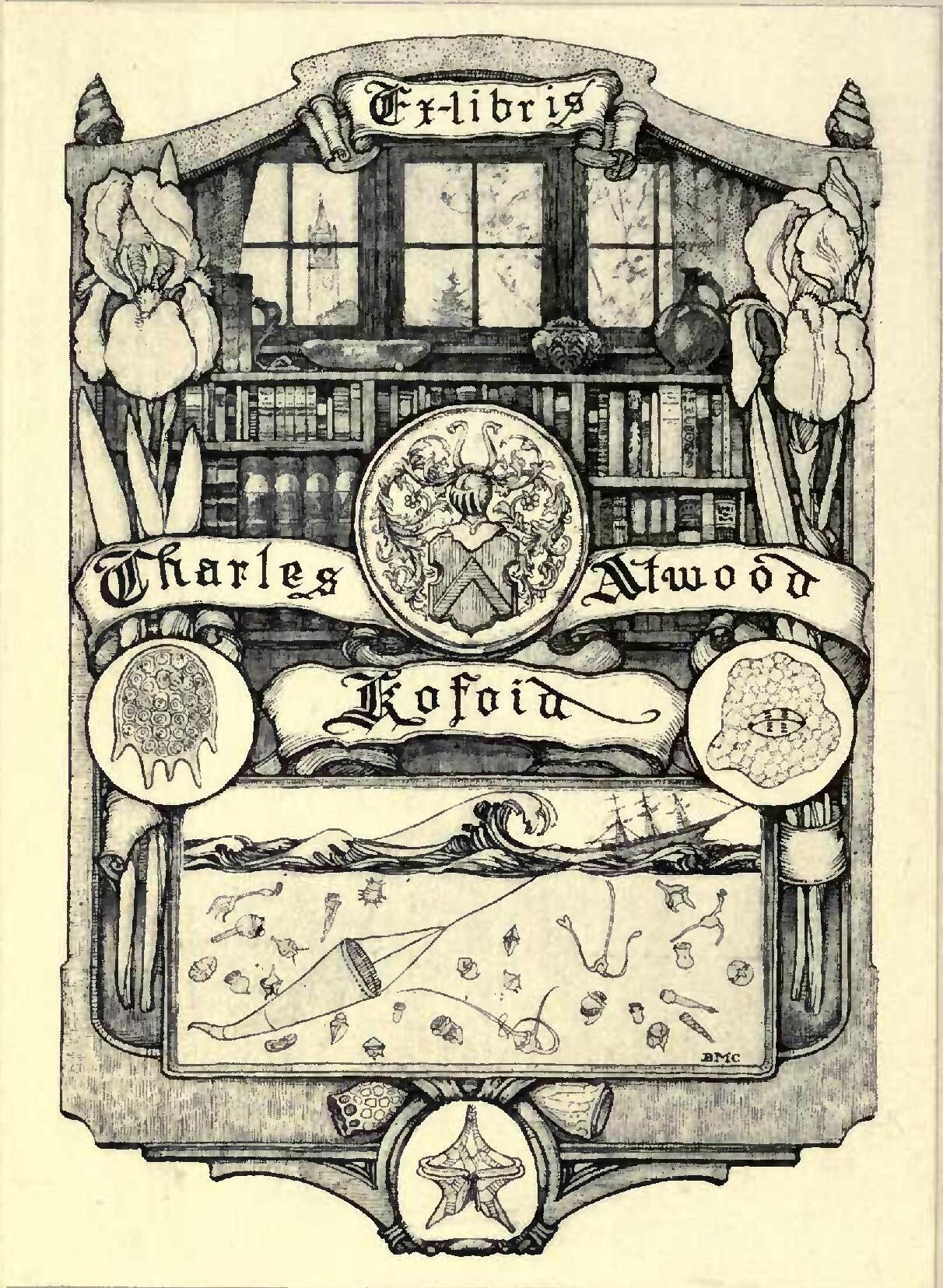
Kofoid's ex-libris, as seen in the Biodiversity Heritage Library

In 1920, Kofoid and Olive Swezy published Pavillardia Kof. & Swezy 1920 (a genus of dinoflagellates) in Univ. Calif. Publ. Zool. pages 323-324. It was named in honour of Jules Pavillard.

In 1921, Kofoid and Olive Swezy, wrote a book about unarmored dinoflagellates in La Jolla, California, in which they described a new genus called Torodinium (with Torodinium robustum and the type species Torodinium teredo). They also published Gyrodinium, which is a genus of dinoflagellates belonging to the order Gymnodiniales in 'Memoirs of the University of California'. vol.5.

In 1929, botanist Pavillard first described Kofoidinium, which is a genus of dinoflagellates belonging to the family Kofoidiniaceae.

Kofoid was elected to the American Academy of Arts and Sciences in 1913, the United States National Academy of Sciences in 1922, and the American Philosophical Society in 1924.

== Sources ==
- Taylor, F J (August 1999). "Charles Atwood Kofoid and his dinoflagellate tabulation system: an appraisal and evaluation of the phylogenetic value of tabulation". Protist. 150 (2): 213–20. doi:10.1016/S1434-4610(99)70023-4. PMID 10505420.
- "IN MEMORIAM: Charles Atwood Kofoid (1865-1947)". J. Parasitol. 39 (1): 108. February 1953. PMID 13035591.
