= Journal of Parasitology =

- Discipline: Parasitology
- Language: English
- Edited by: Richard Clopton

Publication details
- History: 1914–present
- Publisher: Allen Press on behalf of the American Society of Parasitologists (United States)
- Frequency: Bimonthly

Standard abbreviations
- ISO 4: J. Parasitol.

Indexing
- CODEN: JOPAA2
- ISSN: 0022-3395 (print); 1937-2345 (web)
- LCCN: 64036489
- JSTOR: 00223395
- OCLC no.: 1606759

Links
- Journal homepage; Online access; Online archive

The Journal of Parasitology is a peer-reviewed medical journal covering research on parasites published bimonthly by Allen Press on behalf of the American Society of Parasitologists. Content includes research articles, brief research notes, announcements of the society, and book reviews. It was founded and edited by Henry Baldwin Ward in 1914.

== History ==
In 1911, Charles C. Stiles and Brayton H. Ransom at the Bureau of Animal Industry in Washington, D.C., promulgated the need for parasitology journal in America. They asked Henry Baldwin Ward, at the time professor of zoology at the University of Illinois, to initiate the production. The name of the journal was proposed as The American Journal of Parasitology, which George H. Simmons, secretary and editor for the Journal of the American Medical Association changed as the Journal of Parasitology as he felt that it would have more international recognition. Ward, as the owner and managing editor, released the first issue of the journal in September 1914. It started as a quarterly journal for "medical zoology...[specially for] briefer papers and research notes on animal parasites."

In 1924, Ward and William Walter Cort established the American Society of Parasitologists, with Ward becoming the first president. From 1925, the society's proceedings were published in the journal. After several rounds of discussions, the society decided in December 1931 to adopt the journal as its official publication. From September 1932 the journal became the official publication of the society. Ward withdrew as the owner and editor, though continued to serve in the editorial board for the next year. Cort became Chairman of the Editorial Committee that included Robert Hegner and Francis Root. The society decided to inscribe on the journal cover "Founded by Henry Baldwin Ward" permanently.
