= Olive Swezy =

American zoologist and phycologist (1878–1963)

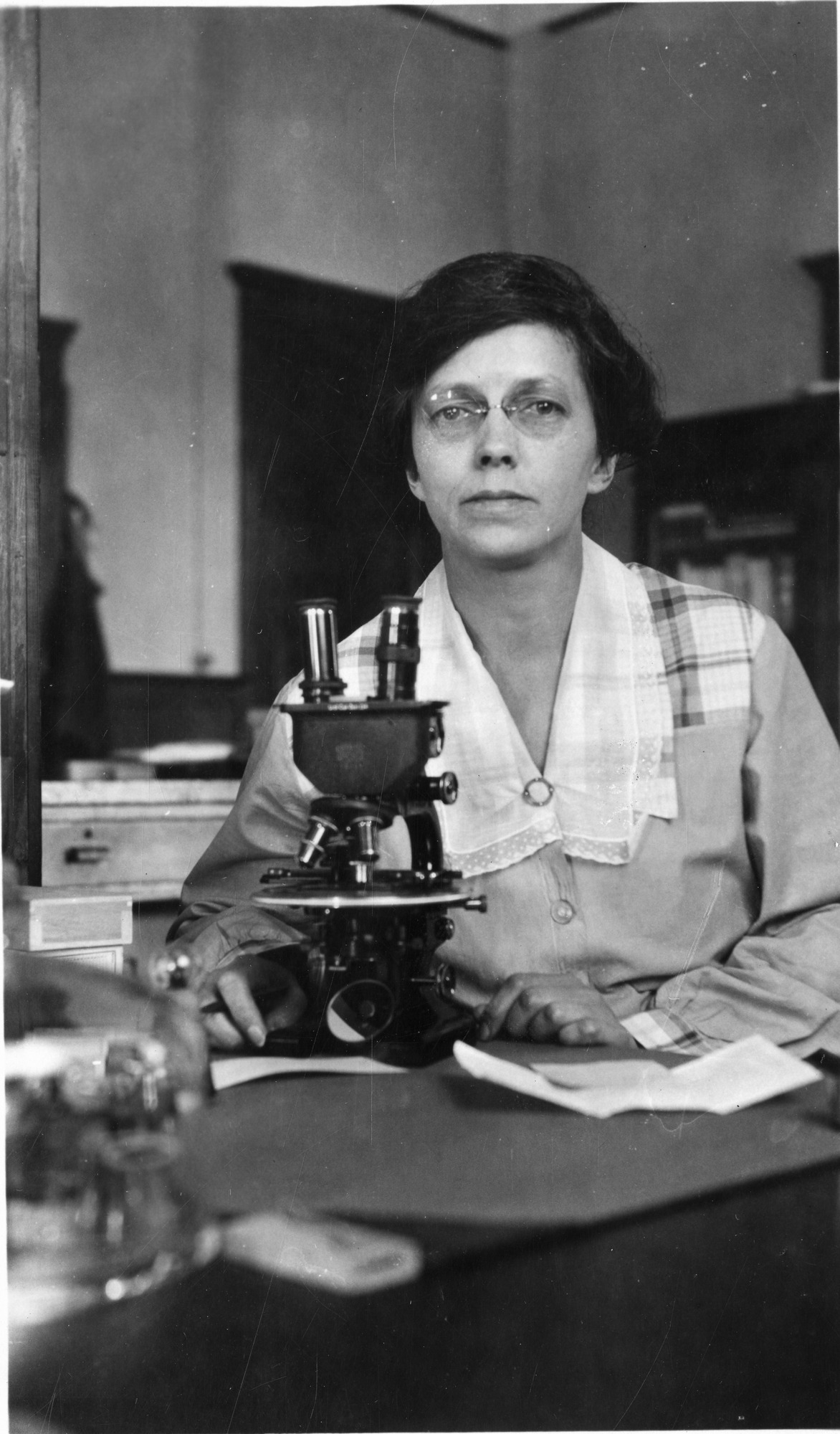
- Swezy c. 1920s–1930s
- Born: 1878; Shohola, Pennsylvania, U.S.
- Died: 1963 (aged 84–85)
- Education: University of California, Berkeley
- Occupation: Zoologist
- Known for: Early work on oogenesis
- Notable work: The Free-Living Unarmed Dinoflagellata; The ovarian chromosome cycle in a mixed rat strain Ovogenesis and the Normal Follicular Cycle in Adult Mammalia

Olive Swezy (1878–1963) was an American zoologist. She studied dinoflagellata and amoebas. Swezy often worked alongside Charles Kofoid in topics relating to applied zoology. She researched amoebas causing illness and performed early research on oogenesis along with Herbert McLean Evans. During the 1940s, Swezy wrote papers against Nazism and holding Japanese Americans in internment camps.

== Life and career ==
Swezy was born in Shohola, Pennsylvania, in 1878. Swezy attended the University of California, Berkeley, for both her undergraduate and graduate studies. She received her BS in 1913, followed by an MS in 1914. In 1915, she was awarded a PhD in zoology from Berkeley, with her dissertation titled The Kinetonucleus of Flagellates and the Binuclear Theory of Hartmann. After finishing her education, Swezy continued her research under the guidance of Charles Kofoid, who was the second chair of zoology.

Swezy was later appointed as an assistant in the Zoology Department at Berkeley before she took the job of assistant director, alongside William Ritter, at the Marine Biological Laboratory (known as 'Scripps') at La Jolla. Swezy played a significant role in much of Kofoid's research. Her letters with Ritter indicate that she had difficulty establishing herself as a scientist rather than being seen as Scripps' part-time librarian. Around 1917, under the guidance of Kofoid, she began studying dinoflagellata at Scripps. Kofoid's contributions often received more recognition than those of Swezy. In 1921, Swezy was acknowledged as a co-author on a 583-page work entitled The Free-Living Unarmed Dinoflagellata, which was based on two decades of research. In its report to the president of the University of California, the Zoology Department referred to the book as "the most significant single progressive event" of that year. A biographical memoir from the National Academy of Sciences regarding Kofoid emphasized the role that the collaborative efforts between Swezy and Kofoid played in his professional work: "His most significant contributions to protozoan morphology were made during his partnership with Olive Swezy". Throughout the 1920s, Swezy continued to collaborate with Kofoid, publishing papers on a variety of subjects related to his applied zoology projects. She also authored and coauthored several papers focusing on parasites and intestinal amoebae.

Swezy and Kofoid discovered a new strain of amoebic dysentery, related to the amoebic dysentery that had afflicted American troops in the Philippines during the Spanish-American War. It was the sixth cause of dysentery infection to be discovered. In 1924, Swezy and Kofoid studied amoebae that were able to enter the body of a human by traveling into water or food that had been contaminated and cause ulcers or abscesses in the liver, arthritis and rheumatism. In 1929, it was reported that Swezy and Herbert McLean Evans had discovered that humans normally have 48 chromosomes, which determined human sex, and that they were not connected to cancer. It was not until 1955 that Joe Hin Tjio discovered that there are normally 46 human chromosomes.

In 1940, Swezy authored a letter to the Oakland Tribune about "the dangers of Nazism". She wrote an article in 1942 that protested against Japanese Americans being forced into internment camps. She appeared in the 1944 American Men of Science. Swezy died in 1963.
