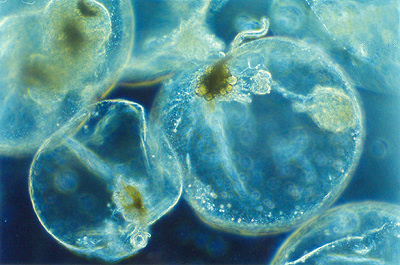
- Noctiluca scintillans, dinoflagellate that exhibits bioluminescence

Scientific classification
- Domain: Eukaryota
- Clade: Sar
- Clade: Alveolata
- Clade: Dinozoa
- Phylum: Dinoflagellata
- Class: Dinophyceae; Pascher, 1914

Orders
- Actiniscales; Akashiwales; Amphilothales; Apodiniales; Blastodiniales; Brachidiniales; Dinophysiales; Dinotrichales; Gonyaulacales; Gymnodiniales; Haplozoonales; †Nannoceratopsiales; Peridiniales; Phytodiniales; Prorocentrales; Ptychodiscales; Thoracosphaerales

= Dinophyceae =

Class of single-celled organisms

Dinophyceae is a class of dinoflagellates.

== Taxonomy ==
- Class Dinophyceae Pascher 1914 [Peridinea Ehrenberg 1830 stat. nov. Wettstein; Blastodiniphyceae Fensome et al. 1993 orthog. emend.]
  - Order Haplozoonales [Haplozooidea Poche 1913]
    - Family Haplozoonaceae Chatton 1920
  - Order Akashiwales Molinari & Guiry 2023
    - Family Akashiwaceae Cavalier-Smith 2017 [Akashiwidae Cavalier-Smith 2017]
  - Order Blastodiniales Chatton 1906 [Blastodinida Chatton 1906]
    - Family Blastodiniaceae Cavers 1913
  - Order Apodiniales
    - Family Apodiniaceae Chatton 1920
  - Order Dinotrichales Pascher 1914
    - Family Crypthecodiniaceae Biecheler 1938 ex Chatton 1952
    - Family Dinotrichaceae Pascher 1914
  - Order Phytodiniales T. Christ. 1962 ex Loeblich 1970 [Dinococcales Pascher 1914; Suessiales Fensome & al. 1993; Dinamoebales]
    - Family †Suessiaceae Fensome et al. 1993
    - Family Phytodiniaceae Klebs 1912 [Dinococcaceae Fott 1960; Hemidiniaceae Bourrelly 1970; Borghiellaceae Moestrup, Lindberg & Daugbjerg 2009]
    - Family Symbiodiniaceae Fensome & al. 1993 [Zooxanthellaceae]
  - Order Brachidiniales Loeblich III 1982 ex Sournia 1984
    - Family Brachidiniaceae Sournia 1972 [Kareniaceae Bergholtz & al. 2006]
  - Order Ptychodiscales Fensome & al. 1993
    - Family Ptychodiscaceae Lemmermann 1899
  - Order Amphilothales Lindemann 1928
    - Family Amphitholaceae Poche 1913 [Amphilothaceae]
  - Order Actiniscales [Actiniscineae (Sournia 1984) Fensome et al. 1993b]
    - Family Actiniscaceae Kützing 1844 [Gymnasteraceae Lindemann 1928]
    - Family Dicroerismaceae Fensome & al. 1993
  - Order Gymnodiniales Lemmermann 1910
    - Cochlodinium group
    - Gyrodinium dorsum group
    - Gyrodinium group
    - Togula group
    - Family Chytriodiniaceae Cachon & Cachon-Enjumet 1968
    - Family Gymnodiniaceae (Bergh 1881a) Lankester 1885 [Polykrikaceae Kofoid & Swezy 1921]
    - Family Warnowiaceae Lindemann 1928
  - Order Prorocentrales Lemmermann 1910
    - Family Haplodiniaceae Lindemann 1928
    - Family Prorocentraceae Stein 1883
  - Order †Nannoceratopsiales Piel & Evitt 1980
    - Family †Nannoceratopsiaceae Gocht 1970
  - Order Dinophysiales Lindemann 1928
    - Family Amphisoleniaceae Lindemann 1928
    - Family Dinophysaceae Stein 1883 [Citharistaceae Kofoid & Skogsberg 1928; Ornithocercaceae Kofoid & Skogsberg 1928]
    - Family Oxyphysaceae Sournia 1984
  - Order Gonyaulacales Taylor 1980 [Pyrocystales Apstein 1909]
    - Family †Lotharingiaceae
    - Family †Mancodiniaceae
    - Family †Pareodiniaceae
    - Family †Scriniocassiaceae
    - Amylax group
    - Family Ceratiaceae Kofoid 1907
    - Family Goniodomataceae Lindemann 1928 [Ostreopsidaceae Lindemann 1928, Triadiniaceae Dodge 1981; Yeseviidae Özdikmen 2009, Centrodiniaceae Hernández-Becerril et al. 2010]
    - Family Gonyaulacaceae Lindemann 192
    - Family Protoceratidaceae Lindemann 1928 [Ceratocorythaceae Lindemann 1928]
    - Family Pyrocystaceae (Schütt 1896) Lemmermann 1899 [Pyrophacaceae Lindemann 1928; Helgolandinioideae]
    - Family Thecadiniaceae Balech 1956
  - Order Thoracosphaerales Tangen 1982 [?Lophodiniales Dodge 1984]
    - Family Calciodinellaceae [Calciodinelloideae Deflandre 1947]
    - Family Glenodiniaceae Wiley & Hickson 1909 [Glenodiniopsidaceae Schiller 1935; Dinosphaeraceae Lindemann 1928; Lophodiniaceae Osorio-Tafall 1942; Glenodiniineae Fensome et al. 1993b]
    - Family Thoracosphaeraceae Schiller 1930 [Oodiniaceae Chatton 1920; Protoodinidae; Protoodiniaceae Cachon 1964; Hemidiniaceae Bourrelly 1970; Cachonellaceae Silva 1980; Stylodiniaceae Pascher ex Sournia 1984; Pfiesteriaceae Steidinger & al. 1996)]
  - Order Peridiniales Haeckel 1894
    - Family †Comparodiniaceae Vozzhennikova 1979
    - Family †Stephanelytraceae Stover et al. 1977
    - Family †Dollidiniaceae Fensome et al. 1993
    - Amphidoma caudata group
    - Ensiculifera group
    - Family Amphidiniopsidaceae Dodge 1984
    - Family Amphidomataceae Sournia 1984
    - Family Cladopyxidaceae Stein 1883 [Cladopyxididae Poche 1913]
    - Family Diplopsaliaceae Matsuoka 1988 [Diplopsaloideae]
    - Family Endodiniaceae Schiller 1935
    - Family Heterocapsaceae Fensome et al. 1993 [Heterocapsineae Fensome et al. 1993]
    - Family Heterodiniaceae Lindemann 1928
    - Family Oxytoxaceae Lindemann 1928
    - Family Peridiniaceae
    - Family Podolampadaceae Lindemann 1928 [Lessardiaceae Carbonell-Moore 2004]
    - Family Protoperidiniaceae Balech 1988 [Kolkwitziellaceae Lindemann 1928; Congruentidiaceae Schiller 1935; Protoperidiniaceae Bujak & Davies 1998]
