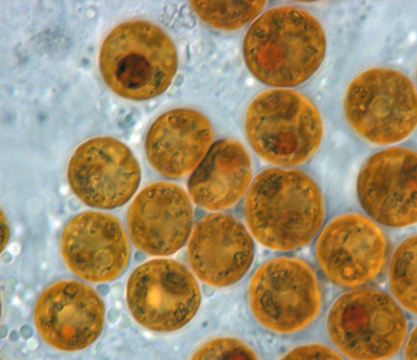

Scientific classification
- Domain: Eukaryota
- Clade: Sar
- Clade: Alveolata
- Division: Dinoflagellata
- Class: Dinophyceae
- Order: Suessiales
- Family: Symbiodiniaceae
- Genus: Symbiodinium; Freudenthal, 1962

Species
- See text

= Symbiodinium =

Genus of dinoflagellates (algae)

Symbiodinium is a genus of dinoflagellates that encompasses the largest and most prevalent group of endosymbiotic dinoflagellates known and have photosymbiotic relationships with many species. These unicellular microalgae commonly reside in the endoderm of tropical cnidarians such as corals, sea anemones, and jellyfish, where the products of their photosynthetic processing are exchanged in the host for inorganic molecules. They are also harbored by various species of demosponges, flatworms, mollusks such as the giant clams, foraminifera (soritids), and some ciliates. Generally, these dinoflagellates enter the host cell through phagocytosis, persist as intracellular symbionts, reproduce, and disperse to the environment. The exception is in most mollusks, where these symbionts are intercellular (between the cells). Cnidarians that are associated with Symbiodinium occur mostly in warm oligotrophic (nutrient-poor), marine environments where they are often the dominant constituents of benthic communities. These dinoflagellates are therefore among the most abundant eukaryotic microbes found in coral reef ecosystems.

Symbiodinium are colloquially called zooxanthellae, and animals symbiotic with algae in this genus are said to be "zooxanthellate". The term was loosely used to refer to any golden-brown endosymbionts, including diatoms and other dinoflagellates. Continued use of the term in the scientific literature is discouraged because of the confusion caused by overly generalizing taxonomically diverse symbiotic relationships.

In 2018, the systematics of Symbiodiniaceae was revised, and the distinct clades have been reassigned into seven genera. Following this revision, the name Symbiodinium is now sensu stricto a genus name for only species that were previously classified as Clade A. The other clades were reclassified as distinct genera (see Molecular Systematics below).

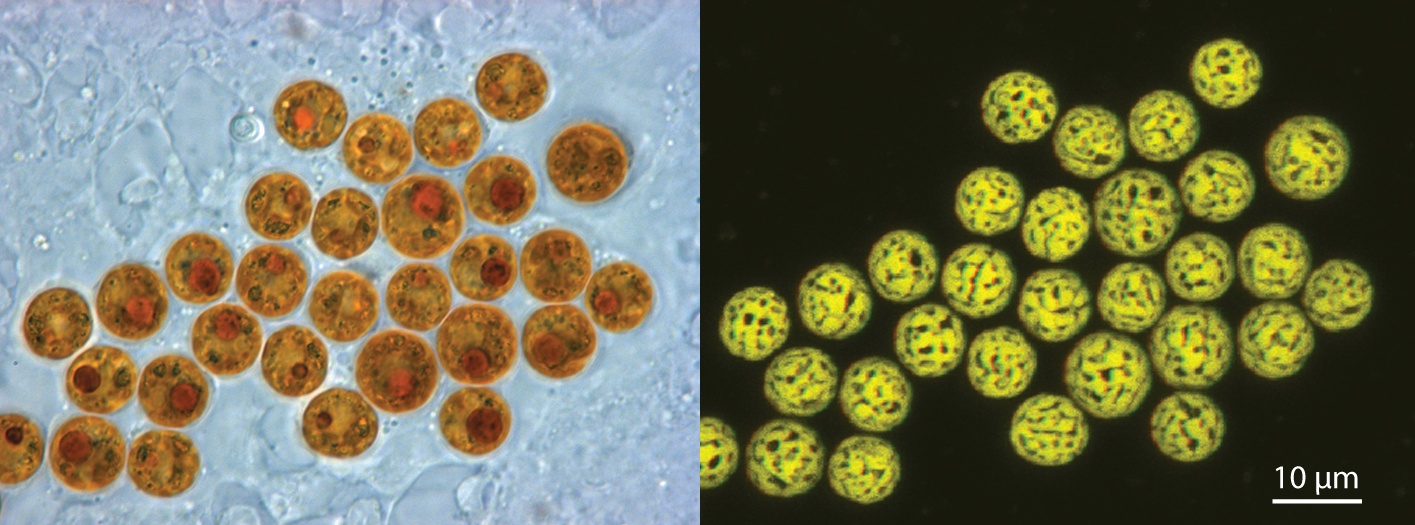
Light and confocal images of Symbiodinium cells in hospite (living in a host cell) within scyphistomae of the jellyfish Cassiopea xamachana. This animal requires infection by these algae to complete its life cycle. The chloroplast imaged in 3-D is highly reticulated and distributed around the cell's periphery

== Intracellular symbionts ==
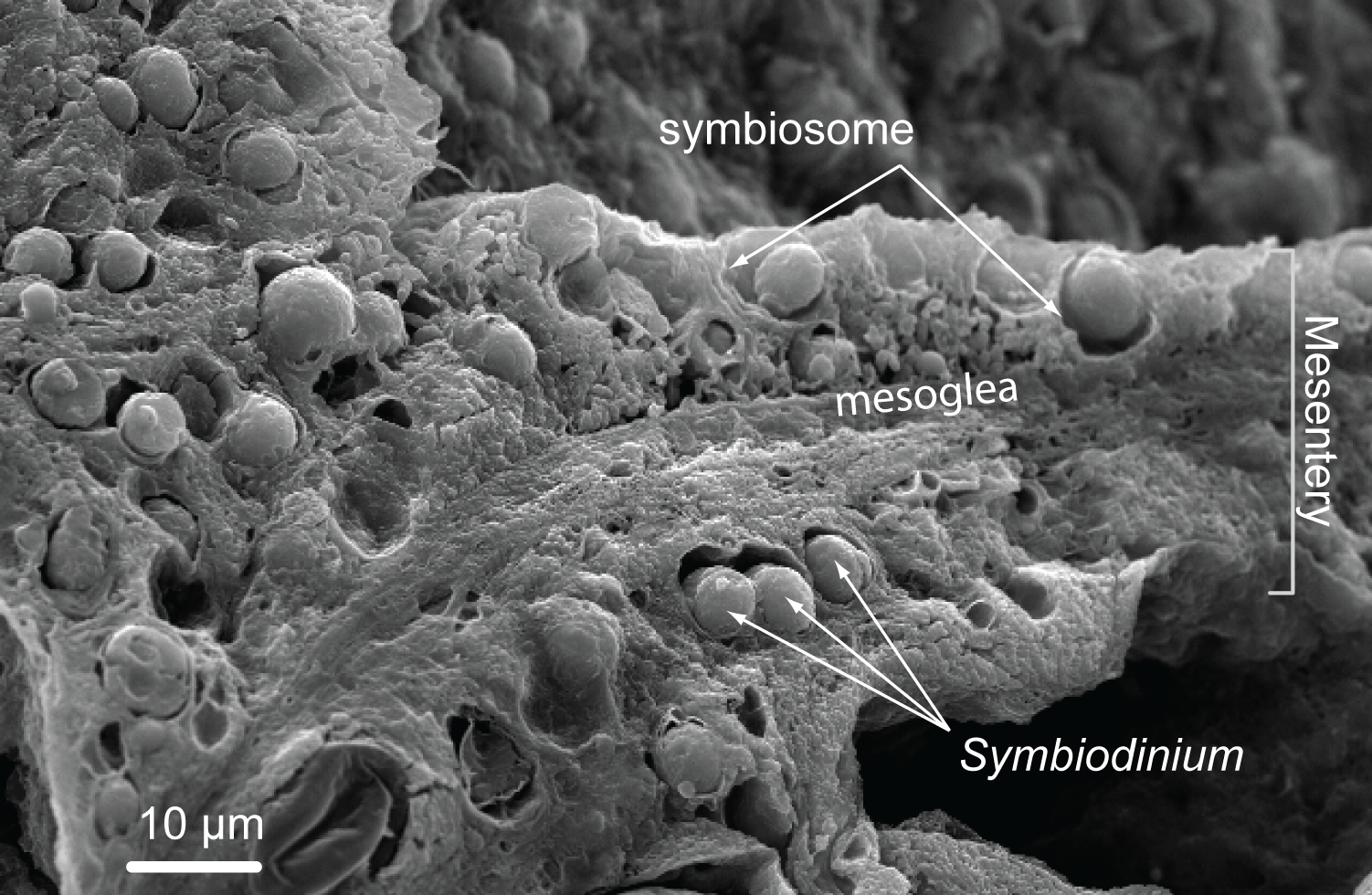
Symbiodinium reach high cell densities through prolific mitotic division in the endodermal tissues of many shallow tropical and sub-tropical cnidarians. This is a SEM of a freeze-fractured internal mesentery from a reef coral polyp (Porites porites) that shows the distribution and density of symbiont cells.

Many Symbiodinium species are known primarily for their role as mutualistic endosymbionts. In hosts, they usually occur in high densities, ranging from hundreds of thousands to millions per square centimeter. The successful culturing of swimming gymnodinioid cells from coral led to the discovery that "zooxanthellae" were actually dinoflagellates. Each Symbiodinium cell is coccoid in hospite (living in a host cell) and surrounded by a membrane that originates from the host cell plasmalemma during phagocytosis. This membrane probably undergoes some modification to its protein content, which functions to limit or prevent phago-lysosome fusion. The vacuole structure containing the symbiont is therefore termed the symbiosome. A single symbiont cell occupies each symbiosome. It is unclear how this membrane expands to accommodate a dividing symbiont cell. Under normal conditions, symbiont and host cells exchange organic and inorganic molecules that enable the growth and proliferation of both partners.

== Natural services and economic value ==
Symbiodinium is one of the most studied symbionts. Their mutualistic relationships with reef-building corals form the basis of a highly diverse and productive ecosystem. Coral reefs have economic benefits – valued at hundreds of billions of dollars each year – in the form of ornamental, subsistence and commercial fisheries, tourism and recreation, coastal protection from storms, a source of bioactive compounds for pharmaceutical development, and more.

== Coral bleaching ==
The study of Symbiodinium biology is driven largely by a desire to understand global coral reef decline. A chief mechanism for widespread reef degradation has been stress-induced coral bleaching caused by unusually high seawater temperature. Bleaching is the disassociation of the coral and the symbiont and/or loss of chlorophyll within the alga, resulting in a precipitous loss in the animal's pigmentation. Many Symbiodinium-cnidarian associations are affected by sustained elevation of sea surface temperatures, but may also result from exposure to high irradiance levels (including UVR), extreme low temperatures, low salinity and other factors. The bleached state is associated with decreased host calcification, increased disease susceptibility and, if prolonged, partial or total mortality. The magnitude of mortality from a single bleaching event can be global in scale as it was in 2015. These episodes are predicted to become more common and severe as temperatures worldwide continue to rise. The physiology of a resident Symbiodinium species often regulates the bleaching susceptibility of a coral. Therefore, a significant amount of research has focused on characterizing the physiological basis of thermal tolerance and in identifying the ecology and distribution of thermally tolerant symbiont species.

The symbiosis Symbodinium-coral could provide higher resistance to multiple stress (desiccation, high UVR) to the coral holobiont through its mycosporine-like amino acids (MAAs). The concentration of MAAs increases with stress and ROS in Symbodinium. These UV-absorbing MAAs may also support light-harvesting pigments during photosynthesis, be source of nitrogen storage and for reproduction. More than half of the Symbodinium taxa contain MAAs.

Symbiodinium trenchii is a stress-tolerant species and is able to form mutualistic relationships with many species of coral. It is present in small numbers in coral globally and is common in the Andaman Sea, where the water is about 4 °C (7 °F) warmer than in other parts of the Indian Ocean. In the Caribbean Sea in late 2005, water temperature was elevated for several months and it was found that S. trenchii, a symbiont not normally abundant, took up residence in many corals in which it had not previously been observed. Those corals did not bleach. Two years later, it had largely been replaced as a symbiont by the species normally found in the Caribbean.

Symbiodinium thermophilum was recently found to make up the bulk of the algal population inside the corals of the Persian Gulf. It is also present in the Gulf of Oman and the Red Sea, at a much lower concentration. Coral that hosted this species was able to tolerate the 35 °C (95 °F) waters of the Persian Gulf, much hotter than the 31 °C (88 °F) of coral reefs globally.

== Molecular systematics ==
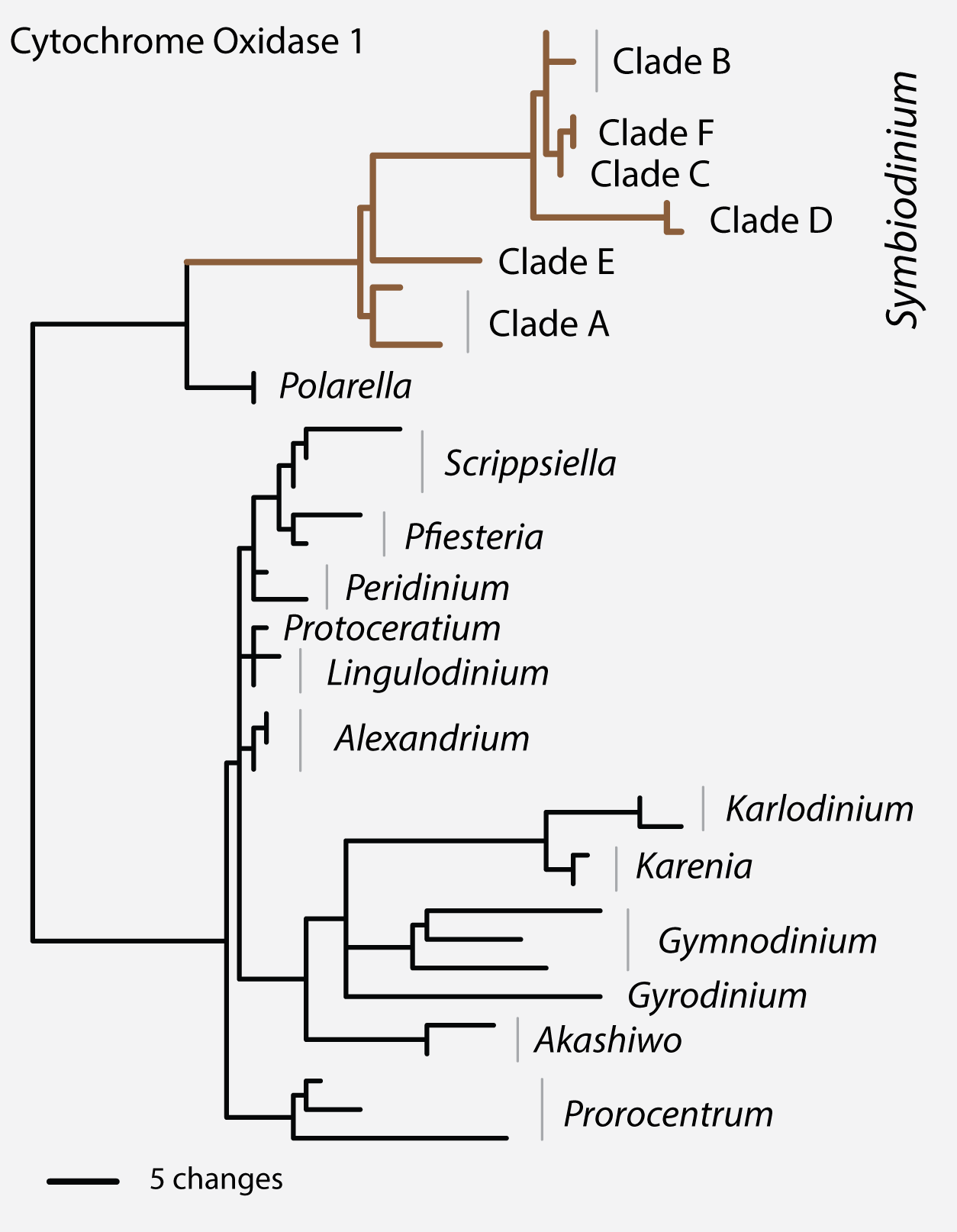
Genetic disparity between clades in the legacy genus Symbiodinium sensu lato compared to other dinoflagellates. Analysis of conserved mitochondrial sequences (CO1) and rDNA (SSU) suggest that a taxonomic revision of this group was required. See clades A—F, Polarella, Scrippsiella, Pfiesteria, Peridinium, Lingulodinium, Alexandrium, Karlodinium, Karenia, Gymnodinium, Gyrodinium, Akashiwo, and Prorocentrum.

The advent of DNA sequence comparison initiated a rebirth in the ordering and naming of all organisms. The application of this methodology helped overturn the long-held belief that (traditional understood) Symbiodinium comprised a single genus, a process which began in earnest with the morphological, physiological, and biochemical comparisons of cultured isolates. Currently, genetic markers are exclusively used to describe ecological patterns and deduce evolutionary relationships among morphologically cryptic members of this group. Foremost in the molecular systematics of Symbiodinium is to resolve ecologically relevant units of diversity (i.e. species).

=== Phylogenetic disparity among "clades" ===
The earliest ribosomal gene sequence data indicated that Symbiodinium had lineages whose genetic divergence was similar to that seen in other dinoflagellates from different genera, families, and even orders. This large phylogenetic disparity among clades A, B, C, etc. was confirmed by analyses of the sequences of the mitochondrial gene coding for cytochrome c oxidase subunit I (CO1) among Dinophyceae. Most of these clade groupings comprise numerous reproductively isolated, genetically distinct lineages (see 'Species diversity'), exhibiting different ecological and biogeographic distributions (see 'Geographic distributions and patterns of 'diversity').

Recently (2018), these distinct clades within the family of Symbiodiniaceae have been reassigned, although not exclusively, into seven genera: Symbiodinium (understood sensu stricto, i. e. clade A), Breviolum (clade B), Cladocopium (clade C), Durusdinium (clade D), Effrenium (clade E), Fugacium (clade F), and Gerakladium (clade G).

=== Species diversity ===
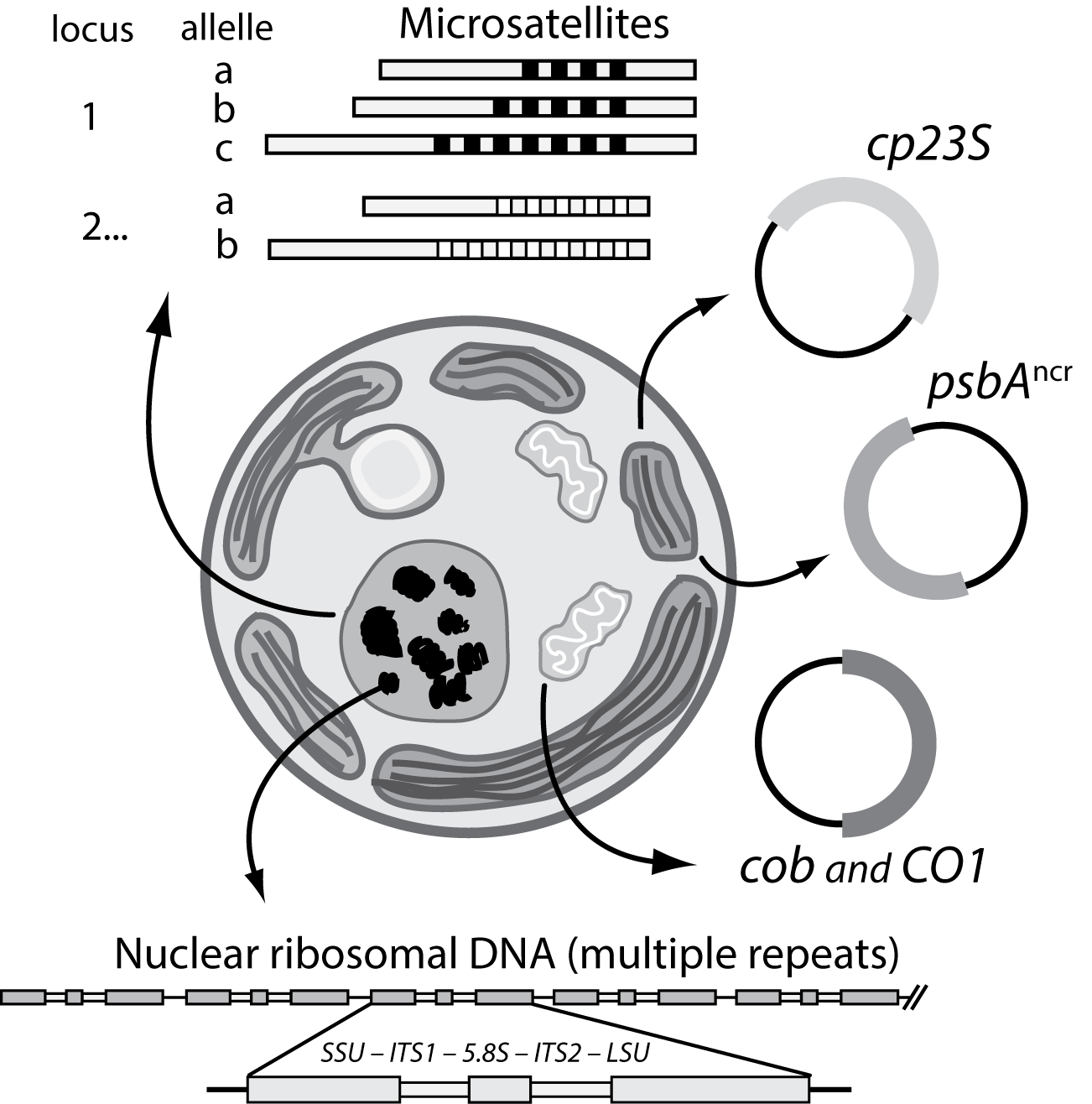
The investigation of Symbiodinium diversity, ecology, and evolution is enhanced by analysis of ribosomal and single copy nuclear, plastid, and mitochondrial DNA. The use of multiple markers, along with a hierarchical phylogenetic classification provides the genetic resolution necessary for investigating species diversity, biogeography, dispersal, natural selection, and adaptive radiations.

The recognition of species diversity in this genus remained problematic for many decades due to the challenges of identifying morphological and biochemical traits useful for diagnosing species. Presently, phylogenetic, ecological, and population genetic data can be more rapidly acquired to resolve Symbiodinium into separate entities that are consistent with Biological, Evolutionary, and Ecological Species Concepts. Most genetics-based measures of diversity have been estimated from the analysis of one genetic marker (e. g. LSU, ITS2, or cp23S), yet in recent studies these and other markers were analyzed in combination. The high concordance found among nuclear, mitochondrial and chloroplast DNA argues that a hierarchical phylogenetic scheme, combined with ecological and population genetic data, can unambiguously recognize and assign nomenclature to reproductively isolated lineages, i.e. species.

The analysis of additional phylogenetic markers show that some Symbiodinium that were initially identified by slight differences in ITS sequences may comprise members of the same species whereas, in other cases, two or more genetically divergent lineages can possess the same ancestral ITS sequence. When analysed in the context of the major species concepts, the majority of ITS2 sequence data provide a reasonable proxy for species diversity. Currently, ITS2 types number in the hundreds, but most communities of symbiotic cnidaria around the world still require comprehensive sampling. Furthermore, there appears to be a large number of unique species found in association with equally diverse species assemblages of soritid foraminifera, as well as many other Symbiodinium that are exclusively free-living and found in varied, often benthic, habitats. Given the potential species diversity of these ecologically cryptic Symbiodinium, the total species number may never be accurately assessed.

=== Clone diversity and population genetics ===
Through the use of microsatellite markers, multilocus genotypes identifying a single clonal line of Symbiodinium can be resolved from samples of host tissue. It appears that most individual colonies harbor a single multilocus genotype (i.e. clone). Extensive sampling within colonies confirms that many colonies harbor a homogeneous (clonal) Symbiodinium population. Additional genotypes do occur in some colonies, yet rarely more than two or three are found. When present in the same colony, multiple clones often exhibit narrow zones of overlap. Colonies adjacent to each other on a reef may harbor identical clones, but across the host population the clone diversity of a particular Symbiodinium species is potentially large and comprises recombinant genotypes that are the product of sexual recombination. A clone tends to remain dominant in a colony over many months and years, but may be occasionally displaced or replaced. The few studies examining clone dispersal find that most genotypes have limited geographic distributions, but that dispersal and gene flow is likely influenced by host life history and mode of symbiont acquisition (e. g. horizontal vs. vertical).

== Species diversity, ecology, and biogeography ==
=== Geographic distributions and patterns of diversity ===
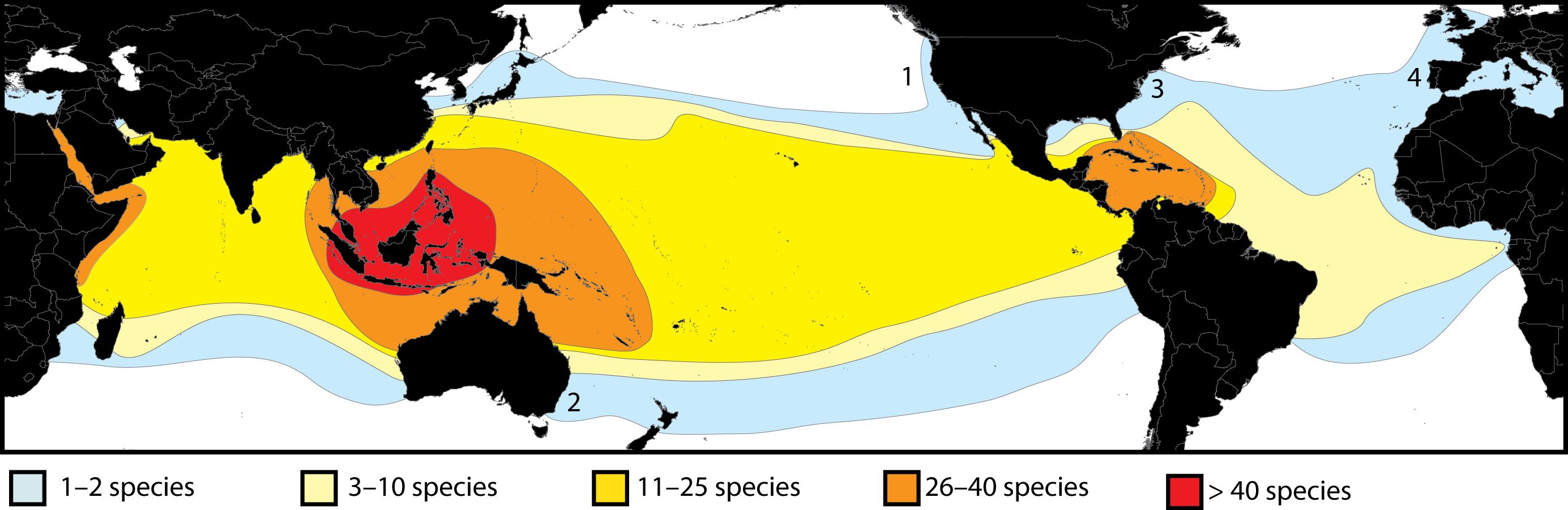
Global distribution and preliminary diversity estimate of common Symbiodinium species associated with cnidarians (rare "species" excluded). Internal transcribed spacer region 2 (ITS2) data (sensu LaJeunesse 2002) are used here as a proxy for species diversity.

Symbiodinium are perhaps the best group for studying micro-eukaryote physiology and ecology for several reasons. Firstly, available phylogenetic and population genetic markers allow for detailed examination of their genetic diversity over broad spatial and temporal scales. Also, large quantities of Symbiodinium cells are readily obtained through the collection of hosts that harbor them. Lastly, their association with animals provides an additional axis by which to compare and contrast ecological distributions.

The earliest genetic methods for assessing Symbiodinium diversity relied on low-resolution molecular markers that separated the genus into a few evolutionarily divergent lineages, referred to as "clades". Previous characterizations of geographic distribution and dominance have focused on the clade-level of genetic resolution, but more detailed assessments of diversity at the species level are needed. While members of a given clade may be ubiquitous, the species diversity within each clade is potentially large, with each species often having different ecological and geographic distributions related to their dispersal ability, host biogeography, and external environmental conditions. A small number of species occur in temperate environments where few symbiotic animals occur. As a result, these high latitude associations tend to be highly species specific.

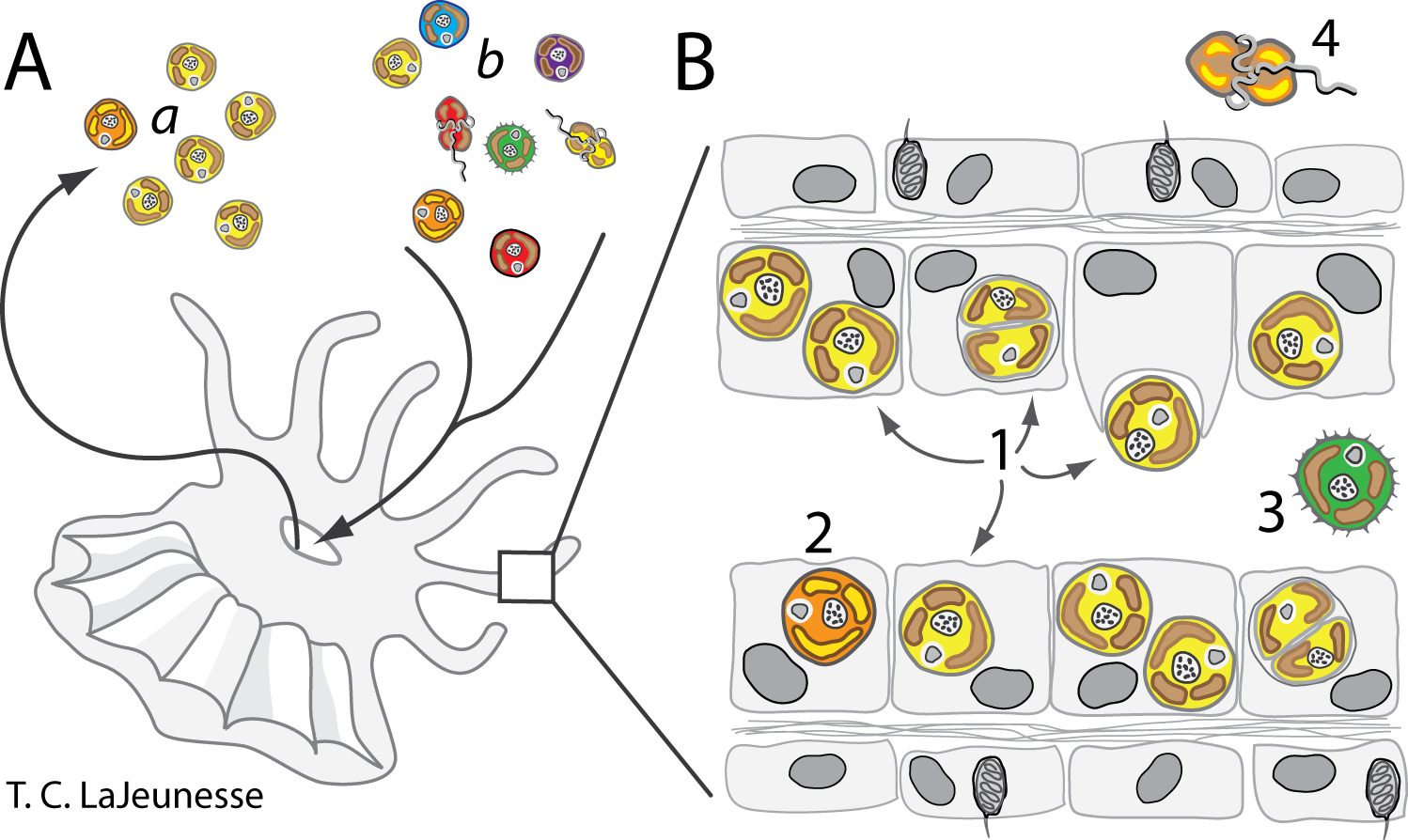
The distributions of Symbiodinium species comprising different ecological guilds in a coral reef ecosystem. A. Host cnidarians can expel millions of symbiont cells (viable and necrotic) per day into the surrounding environment (a). In turn these animals pass large volumes of water through their gastrovascular system for respiration and cellular waste removal, a process that introduces numerous small particles including food and various other Symbiodinium spp. (indicated by differences in cell color) (b). B. The ecological niche, from the viewpoint of functional groups, differs among species of Symbiodinium. Several ecological guilds exist, including abundant host-specific and host-generalist species (1), low background and potentially opportunistic species (2), and non-symbiotic species closely associated with the coral's biome (3) and/or occupying unrelated habitats (4)

=== Species diversity assigned to different ecological guilds ===
The large diversity of Symbiodinium revealed by genetic analyses is distributed non-randomly and appears to comprise several guilds with distinct ecological habits. Of the many Symbiodinium characterized genetically, most are host-specific, mutualistic, and dominate their host. Others may represent compatible symbionts that remain as low-abundance background populations because of competitive inferiority under the prevailing external environmental conditions (e.g. high light vs. low light). Some may also comprise opportunistic species that may proliferate during periods of physiological stress and displace the normal resident symbiont and remain abundant in the host's tissues for months to years before being replaced by the original symbiont. There are also those that rapidly infect and establish populations in host juveniles until being replaced by symbionts that normally associate with host adult colonies. Finally, there appears to be another group of Symbiodinium that are incapable of establishing endosymbiosis yet exist in environments around the animal or associate closely with other substrates (i.e. macro-algal surfaces, sediment surface) Symbiodinium from functional groups 2, 3, and 4 are known to exist because they culture easily, however species with these life histories are difficult to study because of their low abundance in the environment.

=== Free-living and "non-symbiotic" populations ===
There are few examples of documented populations of free-living Symbiodinium. Given that most host larvae must initially acquire their symbionts from the environment, viable Symbiodinium cells occur outside the host. The motile phase is probably important in the external environment and facilitates the rapid infection of host larvae. The use of aposymbiotic host polyps deployed as "capture vessels" and the application of molecular techniques has allowed for the detection of environmental sources of Symbiodinium. With these methods employed, investigators may resolve the distribution of different species on various benthic surfaces and cell densities suspended in the water column. The genetic identities of cells cultured from the environment are often dissimilar to those found in hosts. These likely do not form endosymbioses and are entirely free-living; they are different from "dispersing" symbiotic species. Learning more about the "private lives" of these environmental populations and their ecological function will further our knowledge about the diversity, dispersal success, and evolution among members within this large genus.

== Culturing ==
Certain Symbiodinium strains and/or species are more easily cultured and can persist in artificial or supplemented seawater media (e.g. ASP–8A, F/2) for decades. The comparison of cultured isolates under identical conditions show clear differences in morphology, size, biochemistry, gene expression, swimming behavior, growth rates, etc. This pioneering comparative approach initiated a slow paradigm shift in recognizing that the traditional genus sensu lato comprised more than a single real genus.

Culturing is a selective process, and many Symbiodinium isolates growing on artificial media are not typical of the species normally associated with a particular host. Indeed, most host–specific species have yet to be cultured. Samples for genetic analysis should be acquired from the source colony in order to match the resulting culture with the identity of the dominant and ecologically relevant symbiont originally harbored by the animal.

== Life cycle ==
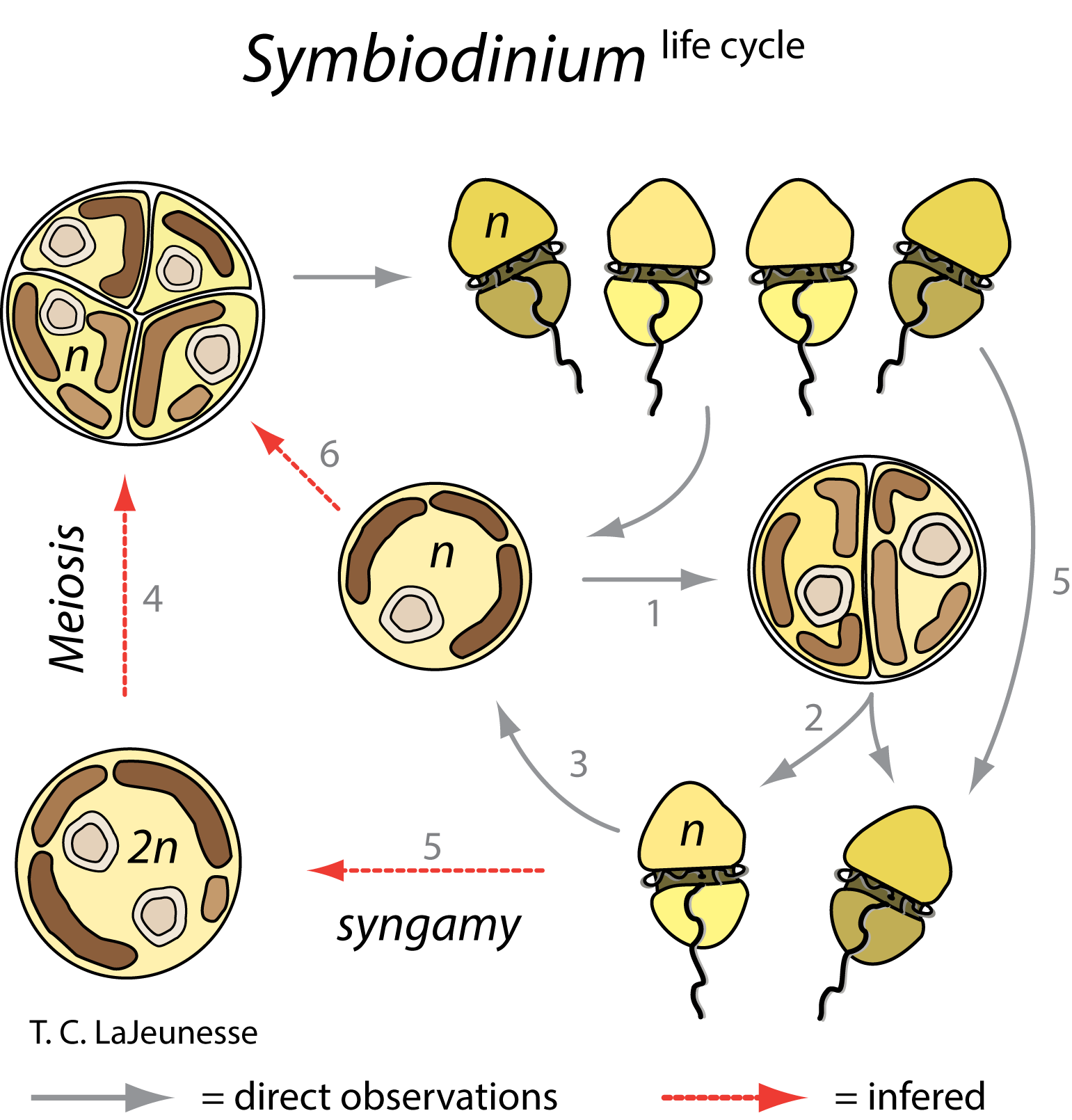
Symbiodinium life cycle

The life cycle of Symbiodinium was first described from cells growing in culture media. For isolates that are in log phase growth, division rates occur every 1–3 days, with Symbiodinium cells alternating between a spherical, or coccoid, morphology and a smaller flagellated motile mastigote stage. While several similar schemes are published that describe how each morphological state transitions to other, the most compelling life history reconstruction was deduced from light and electron microscopy and nuclear staining evidence. During asexual propagation (sometimes referred to as mitotic or vegetative growth), cells undergo a diel cycle of karyokinesis (chromosome/nuclear division) in darkness. The mother cell then divides (cytokinesis) soon after exposure to light and releases two motile cells. The initiation and duration of motility varies among species. Approaching or at the end of the photoperiod the mastigotes cease swimming, release their flagella, and undergo a rapid metamorphosis into the coccoid form. As cultures reach stationary growth phase, fewer and fewer motile cells are observed, indicating slower division rates.

Large tetrads are occasionally observed, particularly when cells in stationary growth phase are transferred to fresh media. However, it is unknown whether this stage is the product of two consecutive mitotic divisions, or perhaps a process that generates sexually competent motile cells (i.e. gametes), or is the end result of meiosis (i. e. as meiotic tetrads) following gamete fusion. There is no cytological evidence for sexual recombination, and meiosis has never been observed, but population genetic evidence supports the view that Symbiodinium periodically undergo events of sexual recombination. How, when, and where the sexual phase in their life history occurs remains unknown.

== Morphology ==
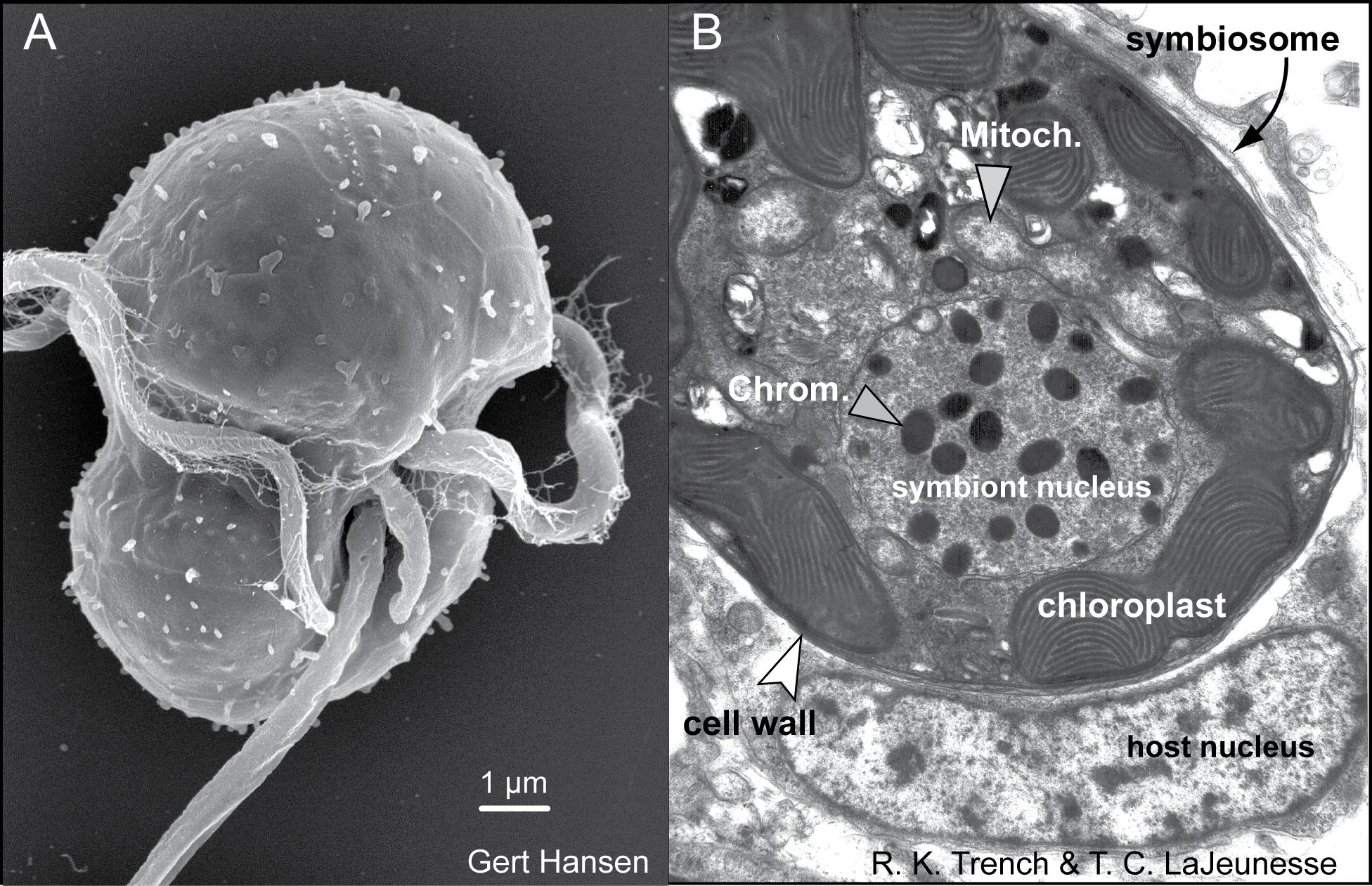
The life stages of dinoflagellates in the genus Symbiodinium. (A) Electron micrographs of a Symbiodinium mastigote (motile cell) with characteristic gymnodinioid morphology (S. natans) and (B) the coccoid cell in hospite. As free-living cells the mastigote allows for short-range dispersal and can exhibit chemotaxis toward sources of nitrogen. Once within the host, these symbionts rapidly proliferate in and in many cases dominate the cytoplasm of the host cell.

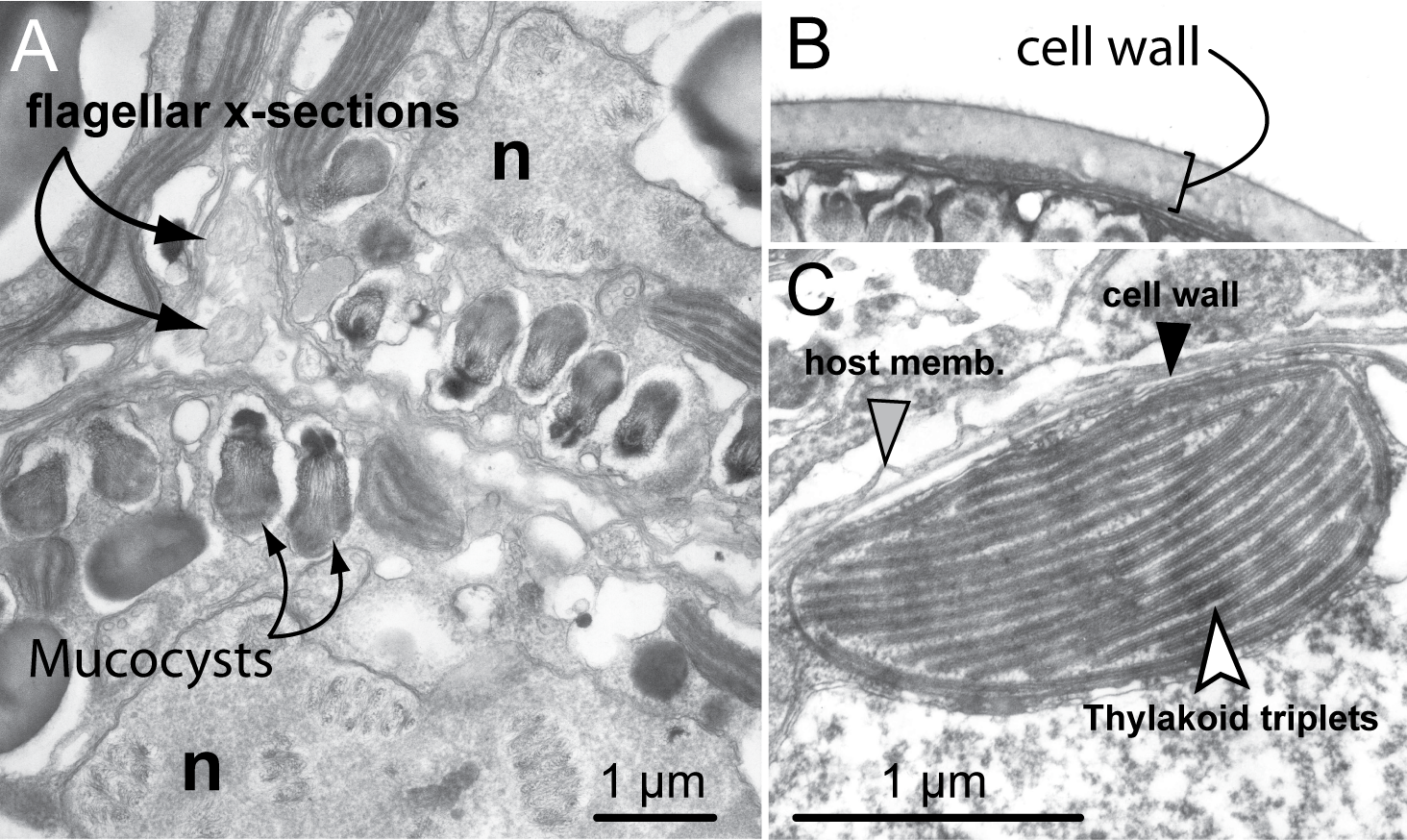
Fine scale features and organelles found among Symbiodinium species. (A) Close-up of divided cells of a tetrad from a culture of S. corculorum that is genetically similar to S. pilosum (both are type/subclade A2). This particular lineage is unusual among described Symbiodinium by possessing mucocysts, and chloroplasts with parallel and peripheral thylakoid arrangements. Flagella are seen in cross section in the space between daughter cells. (B) A thick cellulosic cell wall is observed for many cultured isolates. (C) TEM of a cross-section through a chloroplast lobe at the periphery of the cell with parallel and peripheral thylakoids grouped in sets of three.

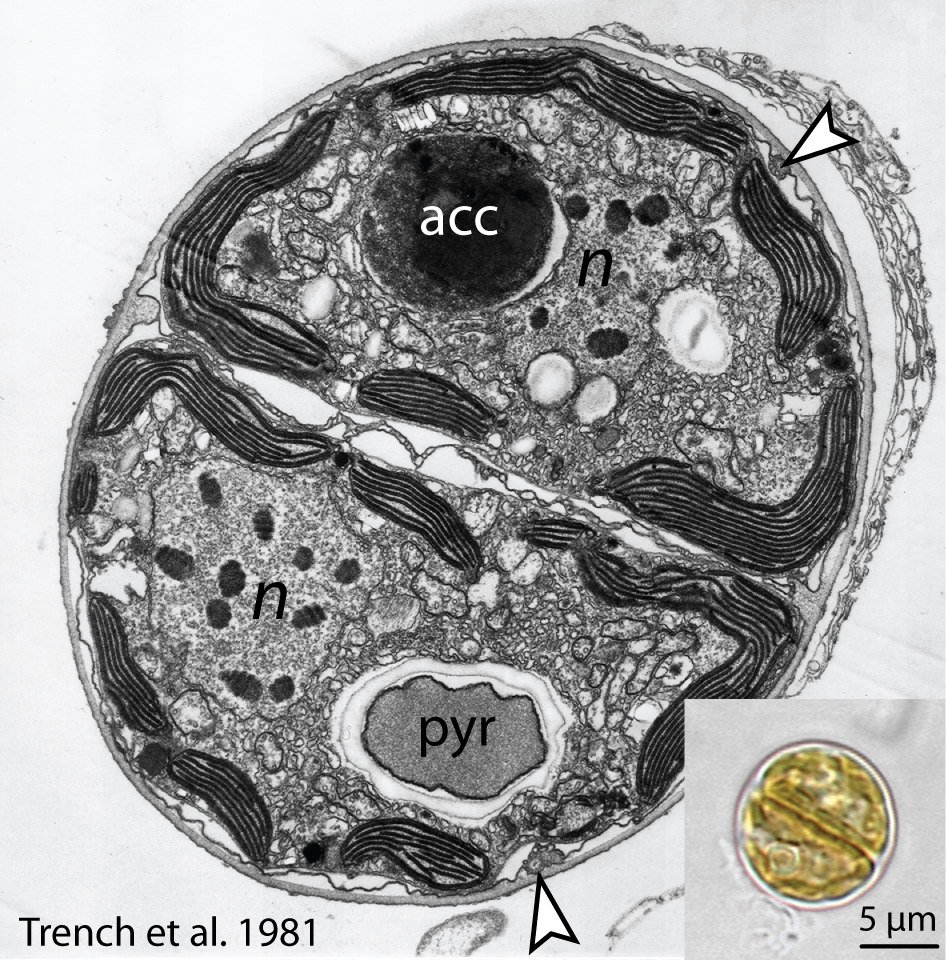
TEM of cross-section through a dividing cell (the doublet). The light micrograph inset depicts a doublet in culture. Flagella are present from the daughter mastigote cells (white arrowheads) prior to emerging from the mother cell wall. n = nucleus; acc = accumulation body; pyr = pyrenoid. (Robert K. Trench et al. 1981)

The morphological description of the genus Symbiodinium is originally based on the type species (holotype) S. microadriaticum. Because these dinoflagellates possess two major stages in their life history (see above), namely the mastigote (motile) and coccoid (non-motile) stages, the morphology of both is described in order to provide a complete diagnosis of the organism.

=== Flagellated (mastigote) cell ===
The motile flagellated form is gymnodinioid and athecate ("nude"). The relative dimensions of the episoma (cell portion above the groove) and hyposoma (cell portion below the groove) differ among species. The alveoli are most visible in the motile phase but lack fibrous cellulosic structures found in thecate ("armored") dinoflagellates. Between the points of origin of the two flagella is an extensible structure of unknown function called the peduncle. In other dinoflagellates, an analogous structure has been implicated in heterotrophic feeding and sexual recombination. In Symbiodinium, it has been suggested that the peduncle may be involved in substrate attachment, explaining why certain cells seem to spin in place. Compared to other Gymnodiniales genera, there is little or no displacement at the sulcus where the ends of the cingulum (or cigulum) groove converge.

The internal organelles of the mastigote are essentially the same as described in the coccoid cell (see below). The transition from mastigote to coccoid stage in Symbiodinium occurs rapidly, but details about cellular changes are unknown. Mucocysts (an ejectile organelle) located beneath the plasmalemma are found in S. pilosum and their function is unknown, but may be involved in heterotrophic feeding.

=== Coccoid cell ===
The coccoid cell of Symbiodinium is spherical and ranges in average diameter from 6 to 13 μm, depending on the species (Blank et al. 1989). This stage is often wrongly interpreted as a dinocyst; hence, in published literature, the alga in hospite is often referred to as a vegetative cyst. The term cyst usually refers to a dormant, metabolically quiescent stage in the life history of other dinoflagellates, initiated by several factors, including nutrient availability, temperature, and day length. Such cysts permit extended resistance to unfavourable environmental conditions. Instead, coccoid Symbiodinium cells are metabolically active, as they photosynthesize, undergo mitosis, and actively synthesize proteins and nucleic acids. While most dinoflagellates undergo mitosis as a mastigote, in Symbiodinium, mitosis occurs exclusively in the coccoid cell.

=== Cell wall ===
The coccoid cell is surrounded by a cellulosic, usually smooth cell wall that contains large-molecular-weight proteins and glycoproteins. Cell walls grow thicker in culture than in hospite. The cell membrane (plasmalemma) is located beneath the cell wall, yet little is known about its composition and function in terms of the regulation of trans-membrane transport of metabolites. During karyokinesis and cytokinesis, the cell wall remains intact until the mastigotes escape the mother cell. In culture, the discarded walls accumulate at the bottom of the culture vessel. It is not known what becomes of the walls from divided cells in hospite. One species, S. pilosum, possesses tufts of hair-like projections from the cell wall; this is the only known surface characteristic used to diagnose a species in the genus.

=== Chloroplast ===
Most described species possess a single, peripheral, reticulated chloroplast bounded by three membranes. The volume of the cell occupied by the chloroplast varies among species. The lamellae comprise three closely appressed (stacked) thylakoids, and are attached by two stalks to the pyrenoid surrounded by a starch sheath. In three of the described species, the thylakoids are in parallel arrays, but in S. pilosum, there are also peripheral lamellae. There are no thylakoid membranes invading the pyrenoid, which is unlike other symbiotic dinoflagellates. The lipid components of thylakoids include the galactolipids as monogalactosyl-diglycerides (MGDG) and digalactosyl-diglycerides( DGDG),; the sulpholipid sulphoquinovosyl-diglyceride (SQDG), phosphatidyl glycerol, and phosphatidyl choline. Associated with these are various fatty acids. The light-harvesting and reaction centre components in the thylakoid membrane include a water-soluble peridinin-chlorophyll a-protein complex (PCP or PerCP), and a membrane-bound chlorophyll a-chlorophyll c_{2}-peridinin-protein-complex (acpPC), along with typical photosynthetic electron transport systems such as the photosystem II reaction centre and the chlorophyll-a-P700 reaction centre complex of photosystem I. Also associated with the thylakoids are the xanthophylls dinoxanthin, diadinoxanthin, diatoxanthin and the carotene, β-Carotene. The pyrenoid contains the nuclear-encoded enzyme type II Ribulose-1,5-bis-phosphate-carboxylase-oxygenase (RuBisCO), which is responsible for the catalysis of inorganic carbon dioxide (CO_{2}) into organic compounds.

All cultured isolates (i.e. strains) are capable of phenotypic adjustment in their capacity for light harvesting (i.e. photoacclimation), such as by altering the cellular Chl. a and peridinin quota, as well as the size and number of photosynthetic units. However, the ability to acclimate is a reflection of genetic differences among species that are differently adapted (evolved) to a particular photic environment. For example, S. pilosum is characterized as a high light-adapted species, while others are low light-adapted (S. kawagutii) or adapted to a larger range in varying light fields (S. microadriaticum).

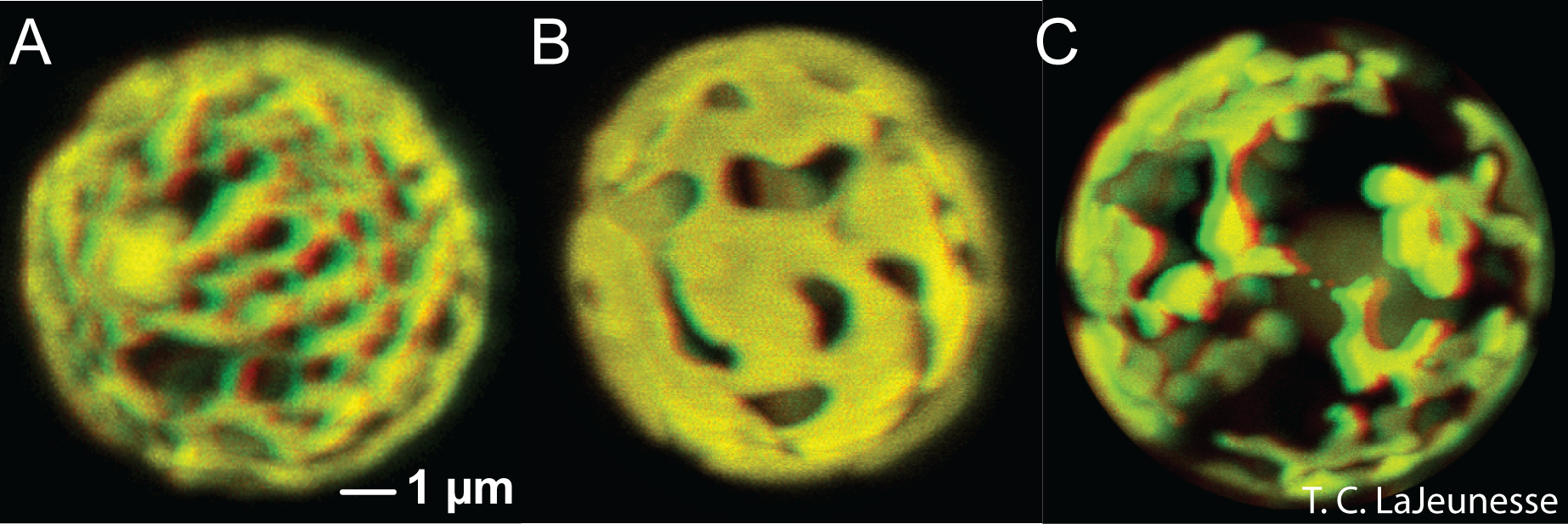
The reticulated chloroplast structures of (A) Cladocopium goreaui (formerly S. goreaui type C1), (B) Symbiodinium fitti (type A3), and (C) Effrenium voratum (formerly S. californium type E1) imaged in 3-D using confocal microscopy of chlorophyll autofluorescence.

=== Nucleus ===
In general, the nucleus is centrally located and the nucleolus is often associated with the inner nuclear membrane. The chromosomes, as in other dinoflagellates, are seen as 'permanently super-coiled' DNA in transmission electron micrographs (TEM). The described species of Symbiodinium possess distinct chromosome numbers (ranging from 26 to 97), which remain constant throughout all phases of the nuclear cycle. However, during M-phase, the volume of each chromosome is halved, as is the volume of each of the two resulting nuclei. Thus, the ratio of chromosome volume to nuclear volume remains constant. These observations are consistent with the interpretation that the algae are haploid, a conclusion supported by molecular genetic data. During S-phase of the nuclear cycle the chromosomes do uncoil to facilitate DNA synthesis, and the volumes of both the chromosomes and the nucleus return to those seen in the G_{2}2 phase.

=== Other cytoplasmic organelles ===
There are several additional organelles found in the cytoplasm of Symbiodinium. The most obvious of these is the structure referred to as the "accumulation body". This is a membrane-bound vesicle (vacuole) with contents that are unrecognizable, but appear red or yellow under the light microscope. It may serve to accumulate cellular debris or act as an autophagic vacuole in which non-functional organelles are digested and their components recycled. During mitosis, only one daughter cell appears to acquire this structure. There are other vacuoles that may contain membranous inclusions, while still others contain crystalline material variously interpreted as oxalate crystals or crystalline uric acid.

== Species ==
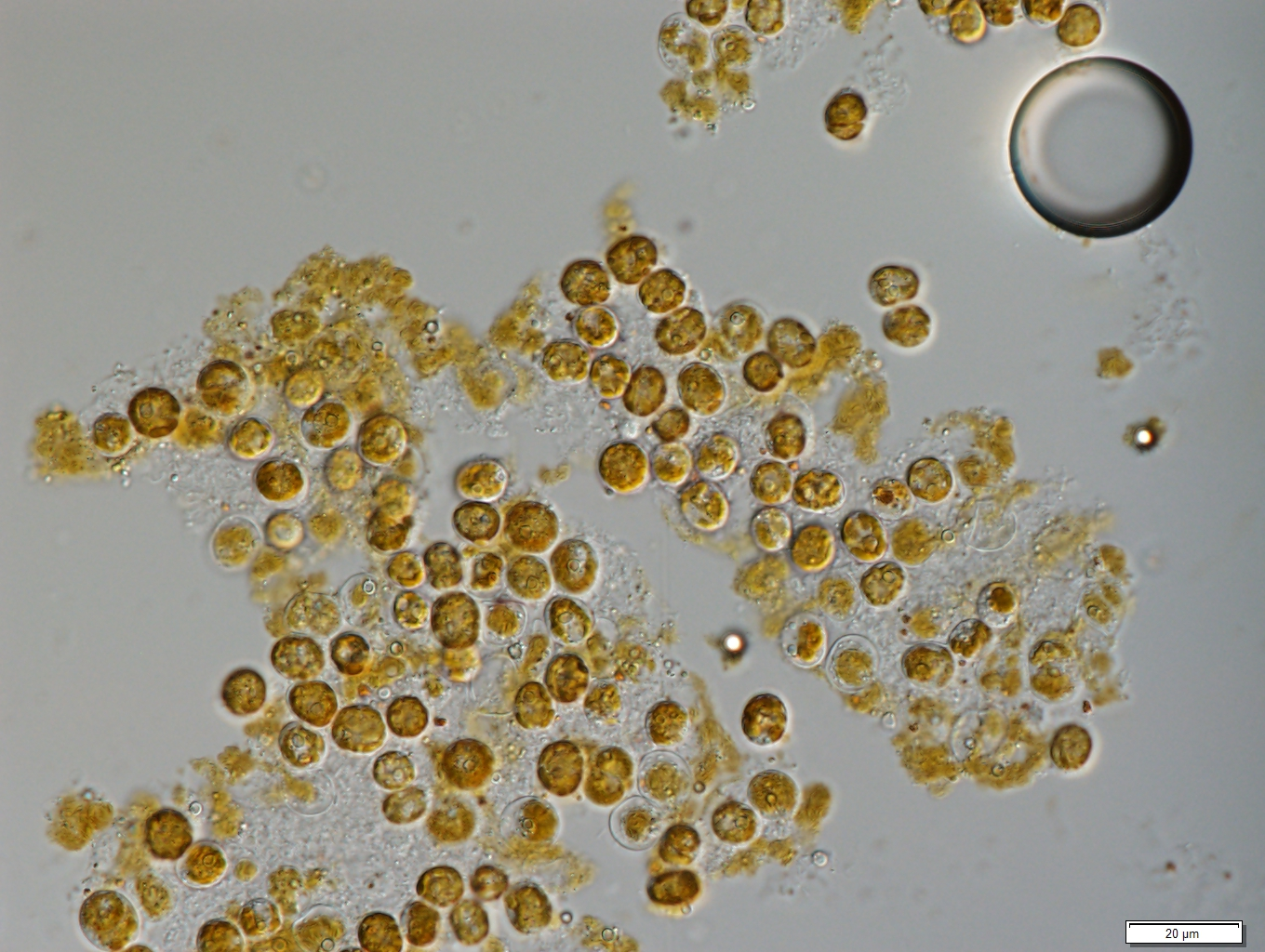
Symbiodinium kawagutii

The following species are recognised by the World Register of Marine Species:

- Symbiodinium bermudense R.K.Trench, 1993
- Symbiodinium californicum LaJeunesse & R.K.Trench, 2000
- Symbiodinium californium A.T.Banaszak, R.Iglesias-Prieto & R.K.Trench, 1993
- Symbiodinium cariborum R.K.Trench, 1993
- Symbiodinium corculorum R.K.Trench, 1993
- Symbiodinium eurythalpos LaJeunesse & Chen, 2014
- Symbiodinium fittii B.K.Baillie, C.A.Belda-Baillie & T.Maruyama
- Symbiodinium goreaui Trench & Blank, 2000
- Symbiodinium linucheae (Trench & Thinh) T.C.LaJenesse, 2001
- Symbiodinium meandrinae R.K.Trench, 1993
- Symbiodinium microadriaticum Freudenthal, 1962
- Symbiodinium minutum T.C.LaJeunesse, J.E. Parkinson & J.D.Reimer, 2012
- Symbiodinium muscatinei LaJeunesse & R.K.Trench, 2000
- Symbiodinium natans Gert Hansen & Daugbjerg, 2009
- Symbiodinium psygmophilum LaJeunesse, T.C., Parkinson, J.E. & Reimer, J.D., 2012
- Symbiodinium pulchrorum R.K.Trench, 1993
- Symbiodinium thermophilum, Hume, D'Angelo, Smith, Stevens, Burt & Wiedenmann, 2015
- Symbiodinium tridacnorum Hollande & Carré, 1975
- Symbiodinium pilosum Trench & R.J.Blank ex LaJeunesse 2017
