= Pinnatoxin =

Class of toxins

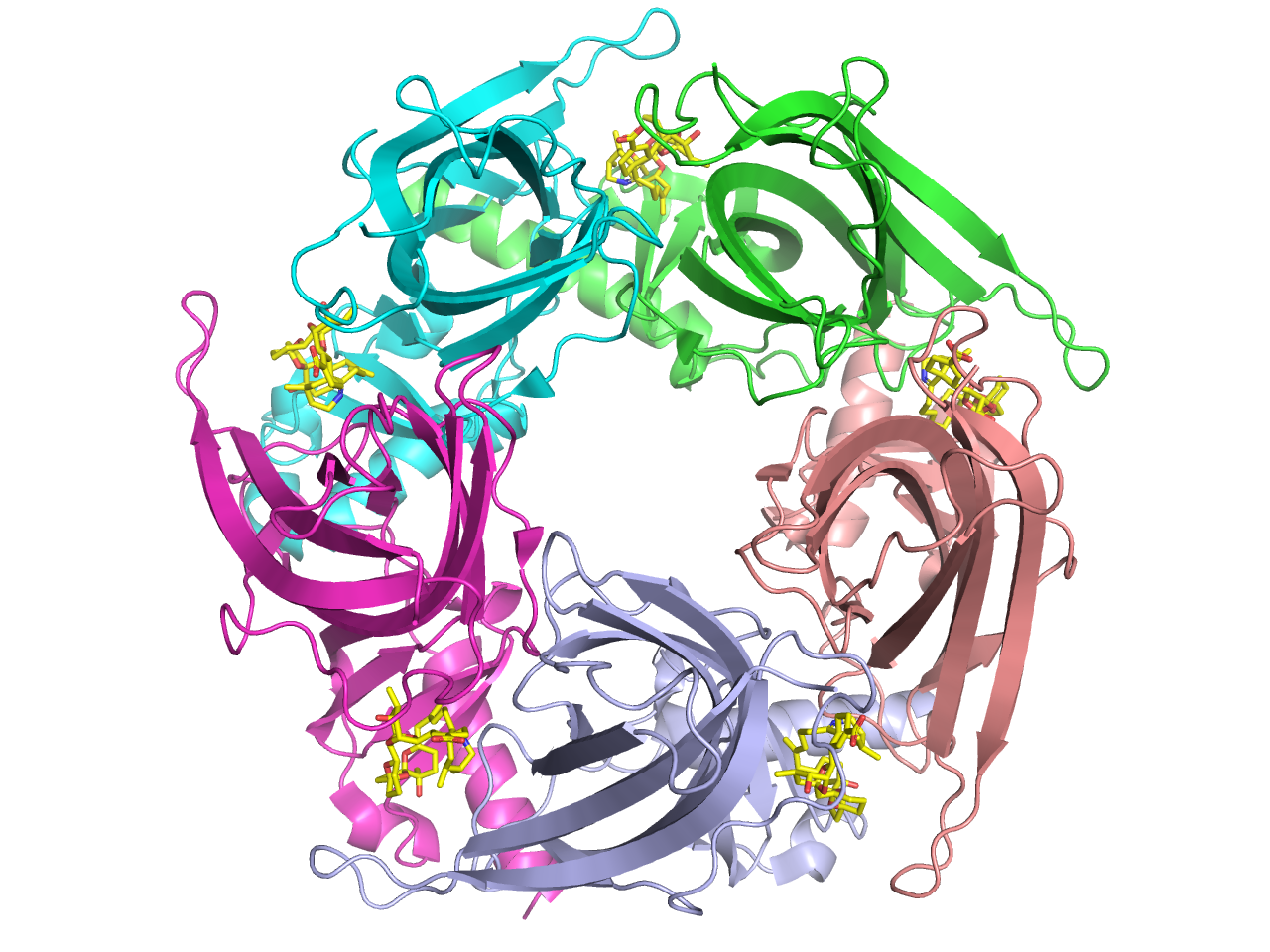
Pinnatoxin A (yellow) bound to the Aplysia californica acetylcholine-binding protein, illustrating the binding site at the interfaces between pentamer subunits. From PDB: 4XHE.

Pinnatoxins are paralytic chemical compounds that inhibit neuronal and muscle-type nicotinic acetylcholine receptors. Although first discovered in shellfish, they are produced by the Peridiniacean dinoflagellate Vulcanodinium rugosum. Eight subtypes, designated pinnatoxin A-H, have been described.

== Discovery and distribution ==
Pinnatoxins are neurotoxins named after the genus Pinna, a group of bivalve molluscs, in reference to their original isolation from members of the genus Pinna attenuata (Note: Reference cited in) and later Pinna muricata. The causative organism producing the toxin was later identified as the dinoflagellate Vulcanodinium rugosum. The presence of the toxin has been identified in various locations, including the Pacific Ocean, the Persian Gulf, the Mediterranean Sea, waters near Canada, Scandinavia, and South China, and in water samples in Ireland.

== Chemistry ==
Pinnatoxins are part of the cyclic imine group of marine toxins. This group currently consists of pinnatoxins, pteriatoxins, spirolides, gymnodimines, spiro-prorocentimine and portimine. Eight different types of pinnatoxins have been described, named pinnatoxin A to H.

All the pinnatoxins contain several key structural elements. The structure of pinnatoxin is composed of a cyclic imine (A ring) spirolinked to a cyclohexene ring (G ring), a dispiro 6,5,6 tricyclic ketal at C12-C23 (rings B, C, D), a bridged bicyclic ketal at C25-C30 (rings E, F) and a 27-membered macrocyclic ring spanning C5-C31.

Toxin	Molecular formula	Molecular weight (Da)	2D structure
Pinnatoxin A	C_{41}H_{61}NO_{9}	712.4444	
Pinnatoxin B, C	C_{42}H_{64}N_{2}O_{9}	741.4707	
Pinnatoxin D	C_{45}H_{67}NO_{10}	782.4845	
Pinnatoxin E	C_{45}H_{69}NO_{10}	784.5008	
Pinnatoxin F	C_{45}H_{67}NO_{9}	766.4889	
Pinnatoxin G	C_{42}H_{63}NO_{7}	694.4683	
Pinnatoxin H	C_{43}H_{65}NO_{7}	708.4834	

Table: molecular formula and molecular weight of pinnatoxins

== Target ==
Pinnatoxin A, G, E and F display a high-affinity antagonism for the neuronal α7 and muscle α1_{2}βϒδ nicotine acetylcholine receptors (nAChRs). The affinity of pinnatoxins for nAChR subtypes is the result of a selectivity mechanism: the bulky bridged EF-ketal ring, specific for pinnatoxins, is able to interact with the sequence-variable loop F of the nAChRs.

The inhibitory potency of pinnatoxin A depends on the nAChR subtype. It has the following ranking in selectivity: α7> α1_{2}βϒδ>α4β2. Pinnatoxin A has a 300-fold greater potency toward the α7 than to the α4β2 nAChR. Furthermore, the blocking of α7 appears to be irreversible.

Pinnatoxin G shows no selectivity between the two neuronal subtypes α7 en α4β2 nAChRs. In contrast, pinnatoxin G interacts with 25-fold higher affinity than pinnatoxin A on the muscle-type nAChR. So the selectivity rank ordering of pinnatoxin G is α1_{2}βϒδ> α7 > α3β2 α4β2. Pinnatoxin E and F have the same order of selectivity for these receptors, although they differ in their potency. The rank order of potency at all receptors is F>G>E.

== Mode of action ==
Pinnatoxins are potent inhibitors of neuronal and muscle type nicotine acetylcholine receptors (nAChRs). They block the nAChR through adherence to the receptor binding site. Different subregions of the pinnatoxin molecule have multiple anchoring points in the receptor-binding site, through which they dictate the tight binding between the opposing loops C and F at the nAChR subunit interface.

When pinnatoxin G and F are bound to the nAChR, they can both reduce or even abolish the amplitude of miniature endplate potentials and nerve-evoked endplate potentials. They do not have an effect on the firing frequency or resting membrane potential. This is characteristic of a postsynaptic mechanism of action.

== Toxicity ==
As of today, no pinnatoxin or cyclic imine has been linked to human poisoning. The toxic effects of pinnatoxin E-H have, however, been examined on female Swiss albino mice.

The symptoms exhibited by mice exposed to a lethal dose of pinnatoxin by intraperitoneal injection are very similar between pinnatoxin E, F, G and H. The symptoms start off with a period of hyperactivity until 10–20 minutes after injection, when an abrupt decrease in activity occurs. In the case of pinnatoxin H injection, mice become immobile instead of hyperactive. During this decrease in activity/occurrence of immobility, abdominal breathing and extension of the hind legs are observed. In some cases, mice suffer from slight exophthalmia. After this period, during which the respiration rate remains normal, the respiration rate declines rapidly within a 2 to 3-minute time interval. Death is preceded by a brief period of running movements, the occurrence of cyanosis and severe exophthalmos. The time between dosing and death varies between 14 and 50 minutes.

Apart from the greater time to onset of inactivity and abdominal breathing at lethal doses (25–40 minutes), and the time to death (approximately 1.3 hours), the symptoms after pinnatoxin E, F or G admission by gavage do not differ much from admission by intraperitoneal injection. In contrast, the time to death after admission of pinnatoxin H by intraperitoneal injection or gavage did not differ.

The behavioural abnormalities observed in mice after a sublethal dose start off with a hyperactive or immobile period shortly after toxin admission, and end with a full recovery. Furthermore, none of the toxins described above lead to aberrant behaviour or abnormal appearance during a subsequent 14-day observation period, nor do they result in any atypical observations at necropsy. However, the symptoms after the hyperactive/immobile period until full recovery, differ between the pinnatoxins:

- After pinnatoxin E dosing, mice become very lethargic, achieving full recovery within an hour.
- A sublethal pinnatoxin F dosing results in immobility, without full recovery until 2–3 hours after toxin admission.
- A sublethal pinnatoxin H dosing results in immobility as well, with full recovery after an unspecified time span.
- 9–13 minutes after pinnatoxin G admission, mice become very lethargic and show an abdominal breathing pattern, while the respiration rate remains normal. Full recovery occurs within 2 hours.
