= Kryptoperidinium =

Scientific classification
- Domain: Eukaryota
- Clade: Diaphoretickes
- Clade: Sar
- Clade: Alveolata
- Phylum: Myzozoa
- Superclass: Dinoflagellata
- Class: Dinophyceae
- Order: Peridiniales
- Family: Kryptoperidiniaceae
- Genus: Kryptoperidinium; Lindemann

Genus of protists

Kryptoperidinium is a genus of dinoflagellates belonging to the family Peridiniaceae.

The genus has a remarkable evolutionary history, being a tertiary endosymbiont. It has cosmopolitan distribution.

Species:

- Kryptoperidinium foliaceum (F.Stein) Er.Lindem.
