= Corythodinium =

Scientific classification
- Domain: Eukaryota
- Clade: Sar
- Clade: Alveolata
- Phylum: Dinoflagellata
- Class: Dinophyceae
- Order: Peridiniales
- Family: Oxytoxaceae
- Genus: Corythodinium; Loeblich, Jr. and Loeblich III, 1966

Species
- Corythodinium belgicae (Meunier) F.J.R.Taylor, 1976; Corythodinium biconicum (Kofoid) F.J.R.Taylor; Corythodinium carinatum (Gaarder) F.J.R.Taylor, 1976; Corythodinium compressum (Kofoid) F.J.R.Taylor 1976; Corythodinium constrictum (Stein) F.J.R. Taylor, 1976; Corythodinium cristatum (Kofoid) F.J.R.Taylor 1976; Corythodinium curvicaudatum (Kofoid) F.J.R.Taylor, 1976; Corythodinium diploconus (Stein) F.J.R.Taylor, 1976; Corythodinium elegans (Pavillard) F.J.R.Taylor; Corythodinium frenguellii (Rampi) F.J.R.Taylor 1976; Corythodinium globosum (Kofoid) F.J.R.Taylor, 1976; Corythodinium latum (Gaarder) F.J.R.Taylor 1976; Corythodinium michaelsarsii (Gaarder) Taylor, 1976; Corythodinium milneri Balech; Corythodinium recurvum (Kofoid & Michener) F.J.R.Taylor, 1976; Corythodinium tesselatum (Stein) Loeblich Jr.& Loeblich III, 19

Synonyms
- Murrayella Kofoid, 1907

Genus of single-celled organisms

Corythodinium is a genus of dinoflagellates in the family Oxytoxaceae.
