= Archaeperidinium =

Scientific classification
- Domain: Eukaryota
- Clade: Diaphoretickes
- Clade: SAR
- Clade: Alveolata
- Phylum: Myzozoa
- Superclass: Dinoflagellata
- Class: Dinophyceae
- Order: Peridiniales
- Family: Protoperidiniaceae
- Genus: Archaeperidinium; E.G.Jørgensen

Genus of protists

Archaeperidinium is a genus of dinoflagellates belonging to the family Protoperidiniaceae.

Species:

- Archaeperidinium bailongense T.Liu, K.N.Mertens & H.Gu
- Archaeperidinium constrictum (T.H.Abé) T.Liu, K.N.Mertens, K.Matsuoka & H.Gu
- Archaeperidinium minutum (Kofoid) E.G.Jørgensen
- Archaeperidinium monospinum (Paulsen) Jorgensen
- Archaeperidinium saanichi K.N.Mertens, A.Yamaguchi, H.Kawami & K.Matsuoka
