= Durusdinium trenchii =

Scientific classification
- Domain: Eukaryota
- Clade: Sar
- Clade: Alveolata
- Phylum: Dinoflagellata
- Class: Dinophyceae
- Order: Suessiales
- Family: Symbiodiniaceae
- Genus: Durusdinium
- Species: D. trenchii

Binomial name
- Durusdinium trenchii (LaJeunesse) LaJeunesse, 2018

Species of single-celled organism

Durusdinium trenchii (formerly Symbiodinium trenchii) is an endosymbiotic dinoflagellate, a unicellular alga which commonly resides in the tissues of tropical corals. It has a greater tolerance to fluctuations in water temperatures than do other species in the genus. It was named for the marine biologist R. K. Trench.

== Ecology ==
Many shallow water corals rely on photosynthetic symbiont protists, commonly known as Zooxanthellae, to provide them with a large proportion of their nutrient requirements. If sea water temperatures rise, conditions may becomes stressful for the corals, and they may expel their zooxanthellae. This process is known as coral bleaching as, without their symbionts, the corals are white.

Durusdinium trenchii is a stress-tolerant species, a generalist able to form mutualistic relationships with many species of coral. It is present in many reefs around the world in small numbers. It is common in the Andaman Sea, where the water is about 4 °C (7 °F) warmer than other parts of the Indian Ocean, and a diversity of corals thrive against the odds. This is due to their symbiosis with D. trenchii. In the Indo-Pacific region, it is found as a symbiont of corals in turbulent waters with wide temperature fluctuations.

In the Caribbean Sea in late 2005, the water was, for three or four months, about 2 °C (4 °F) above the normal temperature for the time of year. This was stressful for corals and researchers found that D. trenchii, a symbiont not normally present in the area, took up residence in many corals in which it had not previously been observed. As a result, the corals did not bleach, but whether this is to the ultimate benefit of the corals remains to be seen. In subsequent years, D. trenchii has become less common in the Caribbean, and the normal symbionts have replaced it in the corals' tissues.
