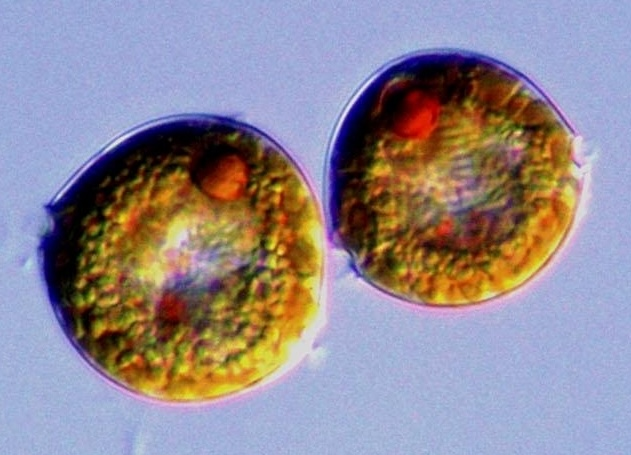
- Durinskia baltica

Scientific classification
- Domain: Eukaryota
- Clade: Sar
- Superphylum: Alveolata
- Phylum: Dinoflagellata
- Class: Dinophyceae
- Order: Peridiniales
- Family: Kryptoperidiniaceae
- Genus: Durinskia; S.Carty & E.R.Cox, 1986

= Durinskia =

Genus of single-celled organisms

Durinskia is a genus of dinoflagellates that can be found in freshwater and marine environments. This genus was created to accommodate its type species, Durinskia baltica, after major classification discrepancies were found. While Durinskia species appear to be typical dinoflagellates that are armored with cellulose plates called theca, the presence of a pennate diatom-derived tertiary endosymbiont is their most defining characteristic. This genus is significant to the study of endosymbiotic events and organelle integration since structures and organelle genomes in the tertiary plastids are not reduced. Like some dinoflagellates, species in Durinskia may cause blooms.

== Etymology ==
The genus Durinskia was named in honor of Rose Durinski by Carty and Cox in 1986.

== History ==
The representative species of Durinskia is Durinskia baltica, which was also the impetus for the genus' creation in 1986. Durinskia baltica was originally described as a brackish water unicellular dinoflagellate and named as Glenodinium cinctum by Levander in 1892. Upon revisiting his work in 1894, Levander renamed Glenodinium cinctum as Glenodinium balticum after revising his previous work. In 1910, Lemmermann reclassified Glenodinium balticum under a freshwater dinoflagellate subgenus called Cleistoperidinium. One of the defining character of Cleistoperidinium is its lack of an apical pore, a criterion Durinskia baltica does not fulfil. To rectify this mistake, Durinskia baltica, known then as Glenodinium balticum, was transferred into the subgenus of Orthoperidinium in 1937. Species within Orthoperidinium are characterized by their four-sided apical plate which is not a character of Durinskia baltica either. The taxonomic hierarchy changed, Durinskia baltica, referred as Peridinium balticum at the time, was transferred to the genus of Peridiniopsis (Bourrelly 1968) and renamed as Peridiniopsis balticum. Upon an investigation conducted by Carty and Cox (1986), Durinskia baltica was determined to belong in a different genus than Peridinium. While the representative or type species of both Peridinium and Durinskia baltica have five cingular plates, the irregular arrangement of the cingular plates in D. baltica differs from the typical cingular plate alignment with postcingular plates in Peridinium. Note that cingular plates are cellulose plates that make up the transverse groove, cingulum, in the outer armor of the organism, whereas precingular plates are plates that form part of the outer armor that is above the cingulum, and postcingular plates are plates that form the outer armor that is below the cingulum. More importantly, all species in Peridinium have seven precingular plates rather than six precingular plates as in D. baltica. After the discovery of these significant morphological differences, a new genus named Durinskia was accepted to accommodate D. baltica. Because some species previously described were misclassified under other genus prior to the establishment of Durinskia, many species that belong in Durinskia have yet to be reclassification or discovered. Durinskia capensis is one of the species that was recently discovered by revisiting previous literature whereas Durinskia agilis was reclassified based on morphology and molecular genetics in 2012.

== Habitat and ecology ==
As of 2017, there are at least four species classified under the genus Durinskia. The known species of this genus, D.baltica, D. oculata, D. agilis and D. capensis, can be isolated from a variety of freshwater and marine habitats. The type species of genus Durinskia, D. baltica, inhabits brackish water and marine environment in Europe, North America, South America, Oceania and Pacific Islands. D. oculata can be found at its type locality (Vltava river at Prague), but also in Ampola Lake in Italy. Orange-red blooms of D. capensis are observed in salty tidal pools along the west coast of Kommetjie, Cape Province, South Africa. D. agilis is a species of sand-dwelling benthic marine dinoflagellate first isolated from the coast of Kuwait. The presence of tertiary plastids (chloroplasts) indicates that species in Durinskia are phototrophic. Although predation is not recorded in recent literature, the relatively recent acquisition of its tertiary plastid in Durinskia indicates organisms must have been trophic at the time of its tertiary endosymbiosis.

== Description of the organism ==
As this genus containing species is part of the subphylum Alveolata and phylum Dinoflagellata, it has the defining characteristics of these groups. As in all alveolates, species in Durinskia have flattened vesicles known as alveoli under the plasma membrane. One of Durinskia's shared characteristics with some dinoflagellates is the cellulose plates contained in alveoli forming the outer armor, theca. The other shared characteristics between Durinskia and dinoflagellates include the presence of condensed chromosomes in the large nucleus called the dinokaryon, and the two surface grooves that each bears one flagellum. The transverse surface groove is called the cingulum which runs laterally around the whole organism, whereas the other groove, sulcus, starts from ventral midpoint of the cingulum vertically down to the posterior end of the organism typically. The cingulum is a useful morphological feature in discerning species. For instance, the angle of descent of the cingulum varies among species. The theca is also separated by the cingulum into epitheca for theca above the cingulum and hypotheca for theca below the cingulum. The red eyespot functions as a lens that allows organisms to respond to visual stimulation. While eyespots and plastids are found in both groups, the origin of these structures differ as discussed the tertiary plastid section. The following are some major discerning features of Durinskia. Species in Durinskia are mostly ovoid. The apical pore in one Durinskia species is a slit-like pore that is located at the apex of the epitheca. The epitheca is either similar in size or slightly longer than the hypotheca. There are no ornaments on the smooth and thin theca in this genus. The cingulum slightly descends downward toward the medial of the organism by around half its width. The sulcus is narrow and may widen as it extends to the posterior end of the organism as in D. agilis. The plates that form the theca immediately above and directly below the cingulum are called the precingular plates and postcingular plates respectively. In the genus Durinskia, organisms have 6 precingular plates and 5 postcingular plates; the cingulum and sulcus is composed 5 unequal plates and 6 plates respectively. Although the shape of the plates varies among species, all species have cingular plates that do not align with the postcingular plates. Since the position of the large nucleus (dinokaryon), shape of the eye spot, and the number and shape of chloroplasts may vary among species, the most reliable method of identification is to observe tabulation pattern of thecal plate. The most interesting feature of Durinskia is the presence of its tertiary plastid which originated from a pennate diatom. Durinskia's tertiary plastid is sometimes confused with the tertiary plastid in Peridiniopsis penardii, which originated from a centric diatom since both plastids have four membranes. As a reminder, a plastid is an endosymbiont that has been incorporated into the host as an essential organelle, and a pennate diatom is elongated in valve view whereas a centric diatom is circular.

== Tertiary plastid ==
As mentioned above, the origin of the plastids in Durinskia is different from the origin of the secondary plastid present in other typical dinoflagellates. In multiple secondary endosymbiotic events, an alga with a primary plastid was integrated into a eukaryotic host as a secondary plastid. The common red plastid found in dinoflagellates is a red secondary plastid that is different as it is bound by three rather than four membrane. These red plastids also contain peridinin, a major carotenoid pigment specific to dinoflagellates. In Durinskia, the function of the secondary red plastid is replaced by incorporating a diatom and its diatom's plastid as a tertiary endosymbiont. The diatom-derived tertiary plastid in Durinskia is not as reduced as other plastids where the secondary host components are completely reduced and only the plastid remains. In addition to retaining the nuclear genome and the large nucleus of the diatom, the diatom's mitochondria and mitochondrial genome, cytosolic ribosomes, and endoplasmic reticulum are retained. However, the diatom can no longer function as a separate entity as it has lost its cell wall, motility and ability to mitotically divide. Moreover, the synchronized division of the cryptic diatom and the host Durinksia indicates the process of integration. Durinskia's tertiary plastid has retained thylakoids that stack in threes and is found to have Chlorophyll a, c1, and c2 and fucoxanthin, a pigment expected of a diatom It has been proposed that the original secondary red plastid in Durinskia has been repurposed as an eyespot after the acquisition of the tertiary plastid. This proposition stems from the observation that Durinskia eyespots resemble the membrane surrounding peridinin-containing plastids as in dinoflagellate's secondary red plastids, and both structures are both triple-membrane bound

== Importance in research and ecology ==
The retention of the nuclear and mitochondrial genome of the diatom-derived plastid in Durinskia has been the well-studied in studies that investigate tertiary endosymbiosis events and symbiogenesis. In Cape Peninsula, Durinskia capensis blooms causes orange-red blooms in tidal pools.

== List of species ==
- Durinskia baltica
- Durinskia oculata
- Durinskia agilis
- Durinskia capensis
