= Corythodinium elegans =

Scientific classification
- Domain: Eukaryota
- Clade: Sar
- Clade: Alveolata
- Phylum: Dinoflagellata
- Class: Dinophyceae
- Order: Peridiniales
- Family: Oxytoxaceae
- Genus: Corythodinium
- Species: C. elegans

Binomial name
- Corythodinium elegans (Pavillard) F.J.R.Taylor, 1976

Synonyms
- Oxytoxum elegans Pavill., 1916

Species of single-celled organism

Corythodinium elegans is a species of dinoflagellate in the family Oxytoxaceae. It is found worldwide. The type locality is the Mediterranean. It is also found in Australian and New Zealand waters.
