= Heterocapsa circularisquama =

Scientific classification
- Domain: Eukaryota
- Supergroup: Alveolata
- Division: Dinoflagellata
- Class: Dinophyceae
- Order: Peridiniales
- Family: Heterocapsaceae
- Genus: Heterocapsa
- Species: H. circularisquama

Binomial name
- Heterocapsa circularisquama Horiguchi, 1995

Species of single-celled organism

Heterocapsa circularisquama is a species of dinoflagellate notable for the production of a biotoxin affecting marine fauna. It is known to produce large red tides off western Japan, causing high bivalve mortality, particularly pearl oysters. It is very similar to Heterocapsa illdefina, however H. circularisquama carries six radiating ridges on its circular basal plate, and its scales have longer spines, among other subtle differences in morphology.

== Description ==
Its cell is small and consists of a conical epitheca. The chloroplast is single and is connected to the unique pyrenoid. Its nucleus is elongated, located in the left side of the cell.
