= Genetic assignment methods =

Genetic assignment methods are powerful statistical methods used to determine the relationship between individuals and populations. The general principle behind these methods is to utilize multilocus genotypes to assign individuals to reference populations based on their origins.

== Genetic assignment methods ==
=== Frequency method ===
This method was first presented by Paetkau et al. in 1995. It assigns an individual to the reference population based on the likelihood of that individual's genotype in the population. This method assumes Hardy–Weinberg equilibrium and independence of loci, as well as an unstated assumption that is the deduced population sample allelic frequencies are close to the exact values. This method involves three steps:

1. Computing the required allelic frequencies in all candidate populations.
2. Computing the likelihoods of the individual's multilocus genotype occurring in each population.
3. Assigning the individual to the population where the likelihood of the individual's genotype is the highest.

=== Bayesian model ===
Inspired by Rannala and Mountain, this method was presented in their 1997 paper, which emphasized a Bayesian approach was used to detect immigration. It assumes that each locus’ allelic frequencies in each population have an equal prior probability. The marginal probability of observing an individual with genotype $\scriptstyle A_k A_{k'}$ at locus j in population i is equal to

$$\begin{align}
& \frac{\left(\frac{n_{ijk}+1}{K_j+1}\right) \left(\frac{n_{ijk}+1}{K_j}\right)}{(n_{ij}+2)(n_{ij}+1)} & & \text{ for } k = k' \\[6pt]
& \frac{2 \left( \frac{n_{ijk}+1}{K_j} \right) \left( \frac{n_{ijk'}+1}{K_j} \right) }{(n_{ij}+2)(n_{ij}+1)} & & \text{ for } k \neq k'
\end{align}$$

n_{ijk} is the number of alleles k sampled at locus j in population i, n_{ij} is the number of gene copies sampled at locus j in population i, and kj is the total number of alleles observed in the whole populations at locus j.

=== Distance method ===
Introduced by Cornuet et al. in 1999, this method uses genetic distance to assign the individual to the “closest” population. For the interpopulation distances, an individual is assigned as a sample of two alleles; for shared allele distance, the measure is the average distance between the individual and the population samples. Note this method does not assume Hardy–Weinberg equilibrium or independence of loci.
