= Heterocapsa rotundata =

Scientific classification
- Domain: Eukaryota
- Clade: Sar
- Clade: Alveolata
- Division: Dinoflagellata
- Class: Dinophyceae
- Order: Peridiniales
- Family: Heterocapsaceae
- Genus: Heterocapsa
- Species: H. rotundata

Binomial name
- Heterocapsa rotundata (Lohmann) Gert Hansen, 1995

Species of single-celled organism

Heterocapsa rotundata is a species of dinoflagellate. Its name reflects its near circular shape. It is known to produce large blooms during winter and early spring in the Chesapeake Bay.
