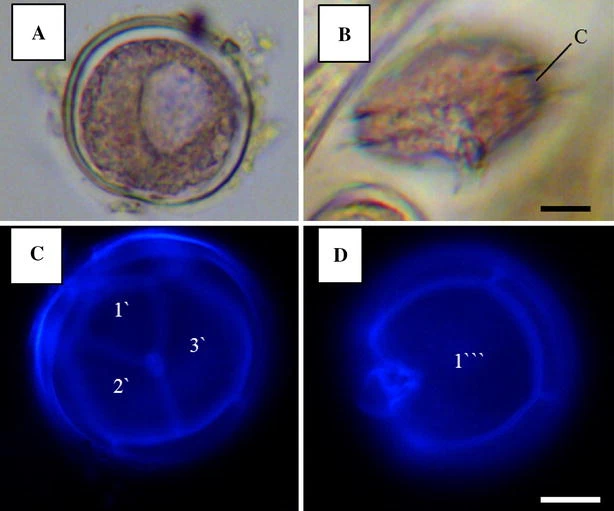
- Diplopsalis lenticula

Scientific classification
- Domain: Eukaryota
- Clade: Diaphoretickes
- Clade: SAR
- Clade: Alveolata
- Phylum: Myzozoa
- Superclass: Dinoflagellata
- Class: Dinophyceae
- Order: Peridiniales
- Family: Protoperidiniaceae
- Genus: Diplopsalis; Bergh

= Diplopsalis =

Genus of algae

Diplopsalis is a genus of dinoflagellates belonging to the family Protoperidiniaceae.

The genus has cosmopolitan distribution.

Species:

- Diplopsalis acuta (Apstein) Entz
- Diplopsalis asymmetrica
- Diplopsalis borealis Pauls.
- Diplopsalis lenticula Bergh
- Diplopsalis ostenfeldii Steemann
- Diplopsalis rotundata
