= Vulcanodinium rugosum =

Scientific classification
- Domain: Eukaryota
- (unranked): SAR
- Phylum: Dinoflagellata
- Class: Dinophyceae
- Order: Peridiniales
- Family: Peridiniales incertae sedis
- Genus: Vulcanodinium
- Species: V. rugosum

Binomial name
- Vulcanodinium rugosum Nézan & Chomérat 2011

Species of single-celled organism

Vulcanodinium rugosum is a species of dinoflagellate first described in 2011 based on samples collected from the French coast of the Mediterranean Sea. It is thecate and its specific epithet is a reference to the striated appearance of its surface. It is the type species of the genus Vulcanodinium. Molecular phylogenetics suggests that it belongs in the order Peridiniales. Studies of the species in culture suggest it has at least two stages in its life cycle, one motile, thecate, and likely planktonic, and one nonmotile, athecate, and likely epibenthic. The species is photosynthetic and seems to prefer warm saline environments. It is found at least in warm Pacific and Mediterranean waters, and is likely globally distributed.

V. rugosum is notable as the source organism for a family of marine cyclic imine neurotoxins such as pinnatoxins, first identified in association with molluscs of the genus Pinna, or Portimin A, the causal toxin behind a severe inflammatory skin disease in fishermen on the Senegalese Atlantic coast in 2020 and 2021. Production of toxin and the distribution of toxin types appear to depend on both environmental conditions and strain.
