= Lessardia =

Scientific classification
- Domain: Eukaryota
- Clade: Sar
- Clade: Alveolata
- Division: Dinoflagellata
- Class: Dinophyceae
- Order: Peridiniales
- Family: Lessardiaceae
- Genus: Lessardia; J.F.Saldarriaga & F.J.R.Taylor

Genus of protists

Lessardia is a genus of dinoflagellates belonging to the family Lessardiaceae.

Species:

- Lessardia elongata Saldarriaga & F.J.R.Taylor
