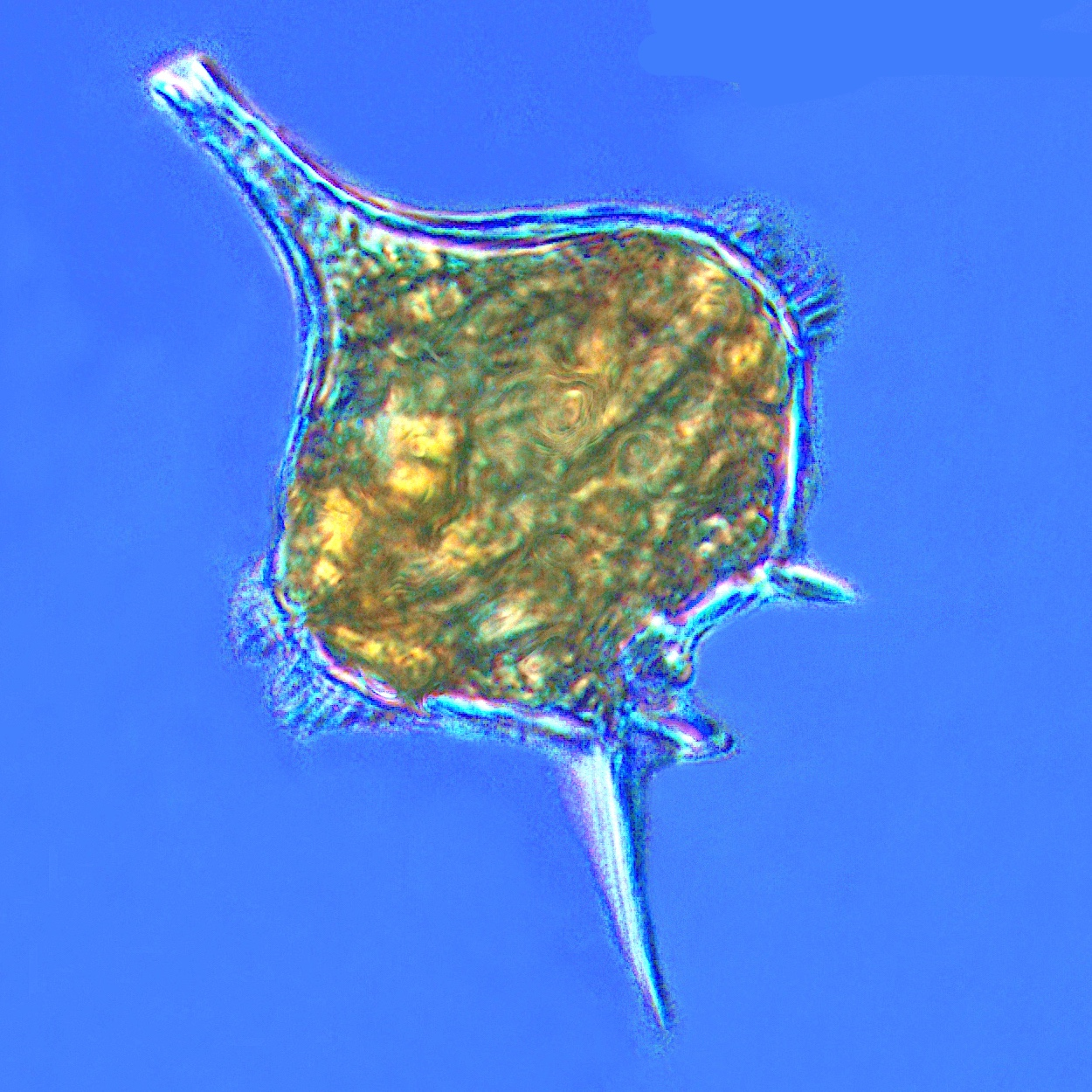
- Protoperidinium sp.

Scientific classification
- Domain: Eukaryota
- Clade: Diaphoretickes
- Clade: SAR
- Clade: Alveolata
- Phylum: Myzozoa
- Superclass: Dinoflagellata
- Class: Dinophyceae
- Order: Peridiniales
- Family: Protoperidiniaceae; Balech

= Protoperidiniaceae =

Family of protists

Protoperidiniaceae is a family of dinoflagellates belonging to the order Peridiniales.

Genera:

- Amphidiniopsis Woloszynska
- Archaeperidinium E.G.Jørgensen
- Diplopsalis R.S.Bergh
- Protoperidinium Bergh
- Trinovantedinium P.C.Reid
