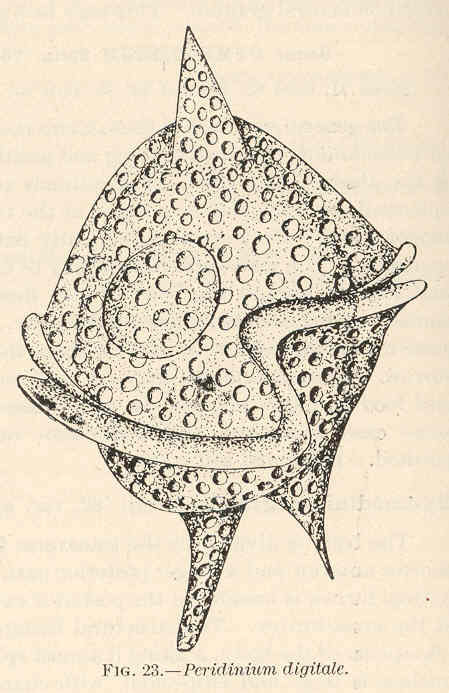

Scientific classification
- Domain: Eukaryota
- Clade: Diaphoretickes
- Clade: SAR
- Clade: Alveolata
- Phylum: Myzozoa
- Superclass: Dinoflagellata
- Class: Dinophyceae
- Order: Peridiniales
- Family: Peridiniaceae

Synonyms
- Peridiniidae

= Peridiniaceae =

Family of dinoflagellates (single-celled organisms)

Peridiniaceae is a family of dinoflagellates belonging to the order Peridiniales.

== Genera ==
Peridiniaceae contains the following genera:

- Alterbia J.K.Lentin & G.L.Williams
- Alterbidinium J.K.Lentin & G.L.Williams
- Amphidiadema Cookson & Eisenack
- Andalusiela W.Riegel
- Apectodinium (L.I.Costa & C.Downie) J.K.Lentin & G.L.Williams
- Archaeosphaerodiniopsis Rampi
- Arvalidinium J.K.Lentin & T.F.Vozzhennikova
- Ascodonium Cookson & Eisenack
- Astrocysta R.J. Davey
- Axiodinium Williams, Damassa, Fensome & Guerstein
- Bohaidina Jiabo
- Bosedinia He
- Brigantedinium P.C.Reid
- Bulbodibium O.Wetzel
- Bysmatrum M.A.Faust & K.A.Steidinger
- Cachonina Loeblich III
- Calciodinellum G.Deflandre
- Carinellum Keupp
- Cepadinium S.Duxbury
- Cerodinium T.F.Vozzhennikova
- Charlesdowniea J.K.Lentin & T.F.Vozzhennikova
- Chatangiella T.F.Vozzhennikova
- Chateauneufacysta A.Ionescu
- Chichaouadinium R.Below
- Colonsaydinium C.O.Hunt
- Cooksoniella T.F.Vozzhennikova
- Corculodinium D.J.Batten & J.K.Lister
- Craspedodinium Cookson & Eisenack
- Cubiculosphaera W.K.Harris
- Diconodinium Eisenack & Cookson
- Diniotorricellia E.A.Molinari-Novoa & M.D.Guiry
- Dioxya Cookson & Eisenack
- Dracodinium H.Gocht
- Ensiculifera Balech ex K.Matsuoka, S.Kobayashi & G.Gains
- Epelidosphaeridia R.J. Davey
- Eucladinium L.E.Stover & W.R.Evitt
- Euperidinium Gran
- Eurydinium L.E.Stover & W.R.Evitt
- Evittodinium G.Deflandre
- Fuetterella Kohring
- Geiselodinium Krutzsch
- Ginginodinium Cookson & Eisenack
- Gippslandia L.E.Stover & G.L.Williams
- Glenodinium (Ehrenberg) F.Stein
- Glochidinium Boltovskoy
- Gochtodinium J.P.Bujak
- Godavariella N.C.Mehrotra & W.A.S.Sarjeant
- Halophilodinium A.R.Loeblich Jr. & A.R.Loeblich III
- Heibergella J.P.Bujak & Fisher
- Hexagonifera Cookson & Eisenack
- Holmwoodinium D.J.Batten
- Hwanghedinium S.-Z.Zhu, C.-Q.He & G.-X.Jin
- Indosphaera A.Kumar
- Isabelidinium J.K.Lentin & G.L.Williams
- Jinhudinium Qian, Chen & He
- Jusella T.F.Vozzhennikova
- Kisselevia T.F.Vozzhennikova
- Kryptoperidinium Lindemann
- Laciniadinium McIntyre
- Leberidocysta L.E.Stover & W.R.Evitt
- Lebessphaera Meier, Janofske & Willems
- Lentinia J.P.Bujak
- Lithoperidinium G.Deflandre
- Luxadinium W.W.Brideay & D.J.McIntyre
- Maduradinium Cookson & Eisenack
- Manumiella J.P.Bujak & E.H.Davies
- Messelodinium O.K.Lenz, V.Wilde, W.Riegel & T.Heinrichs
- Moria A.Sluijs, H.Brinkhuis, G.L.Williams & R.A.Fensome
- Morkallacysta W.K.Harris
- Muiradinium R. Harland & W.A.S.Sarjeant
- Muiriella Churchill & Sarjeant
- Nelsoniella Cookson & Eisenack
- Nephrodinium Meunier, 1910
- Niledziella M.A.Plotnikov
- Ovoidinium R.J. Davey
- Palaeocystodinium G.Alberti
- Palaeohystrichophora G.Deflandre
- Palaeoperidinium G.Deflandre
- Palatinus S.C.Craveiro, A.J.Calado, N.Daugbjerg & Moestrup
- Parabohaidina Jiabo
- Paraperidinium G.-X.Jin, C.-Q.He & S.-Z.Zhu
- Parvodinium S.Carty
- Pentagonum T.F.Vozzhennikova
- Pentapharsodinium Indelicato & Loeblich III
- Peridinium Ehrenberg
- Peridinopsis Clark
- Phthanoperidinium Drugg & Loeblich Jr.
- Phyllodinium Conrad
- Pierceites Habib & Drugg
- Planoperidinium J.de Coninck
- Prominangularia Jiabo
- Pseudorhombodinium Wrenn
- Pyxidiella Cookson & Eisenack
- Quinquecuspis R. Harland
- Rhabdothorax Kamptner
- Rhombodinium H.Gocht
- Ripea D.J.Batten
- Saeptodinium W.K.Harris
- Satyrodinium J.K.Lentin & Manum
- Scrippsiella Balech ex A.R.Loeblich III
- Senegalinium K.P.Jain & P.Millepied
- Smolenskiella T.F.Vozzhennikova
- Soaniella T.F.Vozzhennikova
- Spinidinium Cookson & Eisenack
- Subtilisphaera K.P.Jain & P.Millepied
- Succiniperidinium E.Masure, J.Dejax & G.De Ploëg
- Sumatradinium J.K.Lentin & G.L.Williams
- Svalbardella S.B.Manum
- Talimudinium S.-Z.Mao & G.Norris
- Talladinium Williams, Damassa, Fensome & Guerstein
- Teneridinium Krutzsch
- Trinovantedinium P.C.Reid
- Trithyrodinium W.S.Drugg
- Trivalvadinium M.A.Islam
- Uvatodinium T.F.Vozzhennikova
- Vectidinium M.Liengjarern, L.Costa & C.Downie
- Votadinium P.C.Reid
- Vozzhennikovia J.K.Lentin & G.L.Williams
- Wetzeliella Eisenack
- Williamsidinium Lentin
- Wilsonidium J.K.Lentin & G.L.Williams
- Xandarodinium P.C.Reid
- Xenikoon Cookson & Eisenack
- Xuidinium S.-Z.Mao & G.Norris
- Zhongyuandinium S.-Z.Zhu, C.-Q.He & G.-X.Jin
