= Durusdinium =

Scientific classification
- Domain: Eukaryota
- Supergroup: Alveolata
- Division: Dinoflagellata
- Class: Dinophyceae
- Order: Suessiales
- Family: Symbiodiniaceae
- Genus: Durusdinium; LaJeunesse, 2018

Species
- Durusdinium boreum (LaJeunesse & C.A.Chen) LaJeunesse, 2018; Durusdinium eurythalpos (LaJeunesse & C.A.Chen) LaJeunesse, 2018; Durusdinium glynii (D.C.Wham & LaJeunesse) LaJeunesse, 2018; Durusdinium trenchii (LaJeunesse) LaJeunesse, 2018

Genus of dinoflagellates (algae)

Durusdinium is a genus of dinoflagellate algae within the family Symbiodiniaceae. Durusdinium can be free living, or can form symbiotic associations with hard corals. Members of the genus have been documented in reef-building corals of the Indian and Pacific oceans, as well as the Caribbean. Prior to 2018, Durusdinium were classified as Symbiodinium Clade D.

The symbiotic relationship between coral and algae is essential for the health of coral reef ecosystems, and the presence of Durusdinium provides significant short-term adaptation benefits for corals under environmental stress. In the context of intensifying climate change, the role of Durusdinium is not only to support coral survival but also to maintain the health and stability of coral reef ecosystems.

== Phylogeny history ==
Before 2018, all the symbionts under Symbiodiniaceae are just seven clades in one genus. Named Clade A, B, C and so on. Later the systematics of Symbiodiniaceae was revised, and the distinct clades have been reassigned into several genera. One of them is Durusdinium, which was clade D. Most of these clade groupings comprise numerous reproductively isolated, genetically distinct lineages, exhibiting different ecological and biogeographic distributions.

== Ecology ==
=== The symbiotic relationship between coral and algae ===
The stable symbiotic relationship between corals and their algae symbionts (mainly dinoflagellates) is crucial for the survival of tropical and subtropical coral reef ecosystems. Through photosynthesis, these algae provide over 90% of the nutrients corals require, meeting their essential nutritional needs. This relationship enables coral to thrive in nutrient-poor waters; however, when environmental stress—such as rising seawater temperatures—occurs, corals may expel their algae, leading to coral bleaching. While temporary bleaching does not immediately kill coral, prolonged bleaching can be fatal.

Coral bleaching is directly linked to global warming, particularly rising sea surface temperatures (SST), which pose a significant threat to coral survival. Since 1880, tropical and subtropical SSTs have increased by 0.25 to 0.75 °C, with three large-scale coral bleaching events occurring in the past three decades (Huang et al., 2020). Facing these deteriorating environmental conditions, corals need to adjust the species and proportion of their algae symbionts to adapt to changing environmental pressures.

=== The role of Durusdinium in coral adaptation to environmental stress ===
Research has shown that corals adjust their symbiotic algae to enhance survival under environmental stress. While Durusdinium aids coral survival in high-temperature and rapidly changing environments, its prolonged dominance may negatively impact coral health. The high energy demand of Durusdinium may affect coral growth, calcification, carbon transfer, and reproduction. Therefore, when temperatures drop or environmental stability returns, corals may decrease their Durusdinium proportion and increase Cladocopium (Clade C) to restore balance. The presence of Durusdinium ensures coral survival in adverse conditions, but under non-stressful conditions, corals may gradually reduce Durusdinium to regain optimal health. This phenomenon, known as the "adaptive bleaching hypothesis," suggests that corals adjust algae species and proportions to respond to environmental changes.
