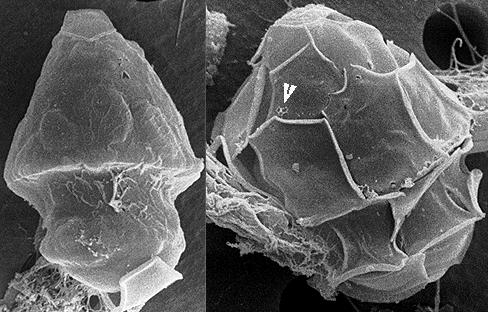

Scientific classification
- Domain: Eukaryota
- Clade: Sar
- Clade: Alveolata
- Division: Dinoflagellata
- Class: Dinophyceae
- Order: Peridiniales
- Family: Heterocapsaceae; R.A. Fensome, F.J.R. Taylor, G. Norris, W.A.S. Sarjeant, D.I. Wharton & G.L. Williams
- Genus: Heterocapsa; Stein

= Heterocapsa =

Genus of protists

Heterocapsa is a genus of dinoflagellates belonging to the family Heterocapsaceae. It is an unicellular photosynthetic dinoflagellate with thecal plates arranged as Po, cp, 5', 3a, 7'', 6c, 5s, 5''', 2'''' and extracellular, three-dimensional triradiate body scales. The genus is often found in worldwide algal blooms, causing harmful algal blooms (HABs) that devastate the environment or agriculture. Its mixotroph properties grants an advantage to its cosmopolitan distribution, being able to switch to phagotrophy, when light penetration is low.

== Characteristics ==
Theca is the body armor that overlays the surface of many members of Peridiniales and Gonyaulacales (under Peridiniphycidae), including Heterocapsa. It is mainly composed of cellulose secreted in the Amphiesmal Vesicles, which is right beneath the cell membrane and serves important functions and characters to dinoflagellates, as they are of SAR Super group.

In Heterocapsa, the arrangement of theca is crucial for the identification of species. Each has similar yet distinguishable thecal patterns from each other's (e.g. cone-shape, oval-shape, antapical horn), this pattern is called "Tabulation". The first theory of how tabulation can be of significance to phylogeny was proposed by late Zoologist Charles Atwood Kofoid.

Thecal plates of this genus are categorized as following: epitheca, hypotheca, cingulum, sulcus. Each part is composed of various series of plates: apical, postcingular, sulcul, etc., and is denoted by numbers or letters and apostrophes, starting from the anterior-most series. The common tabulation series of Heterocapsa is: Po, cp, 5' , 3a, 7'' , 6c, 5s, 5''' , 2''''(abbreviation below).

(Pore plate, canal plate, apical plates, anterior intercalary plates, precingular plates, cingular plates, sulcul plates, postcingular plates, antapical plates.)

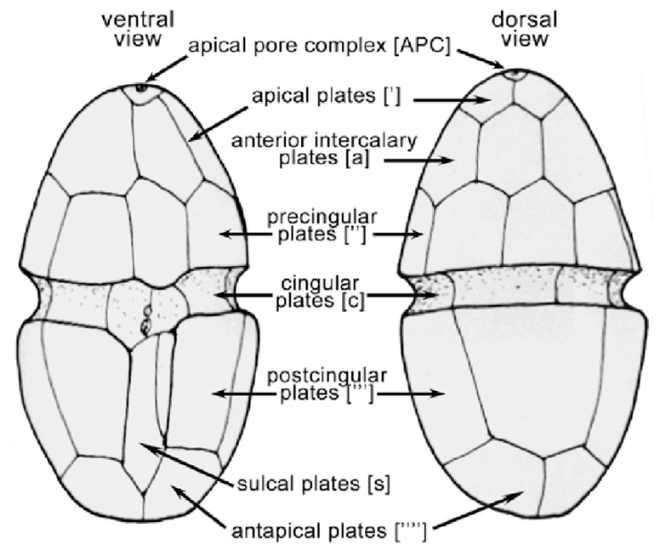
Tabulation Nomenclature

=== Body scales ===
Body scales is a very unique shared feature of Heterocapsa. It has been widely studied to identify certain species. However, no previous study had pounded the question of how does Heterocapsa produce its body scales. Some had speculated such process may be involved with the Golgi Apparatus, as scales were observed inside vesicles. Morphology of the body scales is a common triradiate basal plate, with vertical spines and longitudinal bars constructed on top of basal plate.

=== Organelles ===
Like many other Dinoflagellates, the nucleus of Heterocapsa contains large amount of genetic information. Named Dinokaryon, DNA found inside is intensely condensed into a Liquid Crystal State.

Being photosynthetic, which isn't commonly seen in Dinoflagellates, Heterocapsa possesses reticulated chloroplast and pyrenoid. As suggested by Iwataki, 2008, the relative position of these two organelles may provide insights on distinguishing species with similar tabulation series. For instance, H. pygmaea has two pyrenoids in one cell. In H. circularisquama, the pyrenoid is located in the hypotheca, whereas in H. illdefina, it is located in the epitheca. Trichocyst for defensive mechanisms can also be observed in Heterocapsa.

=== Harmful algal blooms ===
Many species under Heterocapsa have been reported causing algal blooms in late summer to winter, and all but blooms caused by H.rotundata in the Chesapeake Bay, Maryland, USA were not toxic. H.circularisquama on the other hand, is constantly found in HABs globally, especially from Japan, and with signs of intruding the Bay of Kuwait. The hemolytic toxin produced by H.circularisquama is lethal to bivalves and fishes, with reports of cardiac arrest to oyster farms in western Japan. Though the mechanism of toxin production is still unknown, some suggested the endosymbiotic bacteria may have participate in the process.

== Species ==
- Heterocapsa arctica Horiguchi, 1997
- Heterocapsa bohaiensis J.Xiao & Y.Li, 2018
- Heterocapsa chattonii (Biecheler) P.H.Campbell, 1973
- Heterocapsa circularisquama Horiguchi, 1995
- Heterocapsa horiguchii Iwataki, Takayama & Matsuoka, 2002
- Heterocapsa illdefina (Herman & Sweeney) Morrill & Loeblich III, 1981
- Heterocapsa kollmeriana M.J.Swift & McLaughlin, 1970
- Heterocapsa lanceolata Iwataki & Fukuyo, 2002
- Heterocapsa minima A.J.Pomroy, 1989
- Heterocapsa niei (Loeblich III) Morrill & Loeblich III, 1981
- Heterocapsa orientalis Iwataki, Botes & Fukuyo, 2003
- Heterocapsa ovata Iwataki & Fukuyo, 2003
- Heterocapsa pacifica Kofoid, 1907
- Heterocapsa psammophila M.Tamura, M.Iwataki & M.Horiguchi, 2006
- Heterocapsa pseudotriquetra Iwataki, G.Hansen & Fukuyo, 2002
- Heterocapsa pygmaea Lobelich III, R.J.Schmidt & Sherley, 1981
- Heterocapsa rotundata (Lohmann) Gert Hansen, 1995
- Heterocapsa steinii Tillmann, Gottschling, Hoppenrath, Kusber & Elbrächter, 2017
- Heterocapsa umbilicata Stein, 1883
