= Polarella =

Scientific classification
- Domain: Eukaryota
- Clade: Sar
- Clade: Alveolata
- Division: Dinoflagellata
- Class: Dinophyceae
- Order: Suessiales
- Family: Suessiaceae
- Genus: Polarella; M.Montresor, G.Procaccini & D.K.Stoecker
- Species: P. glacialis

Binomial name
- Polarella glacialis M.Montresor, G.Procaccini & D.K.Stoecker

Genus of single-celled organisms

Polarella is a dinoflagellate, and, when described in 1999, was the only extant genus of the Suessiaceae family. Since then, multiple extant genera in the family have been described. The genus was described in 1999 by Marina Montresor, Gabriele Procaccini, and Diane K. Stoecker, and contains only one species, Polarella glacialis. Polarella inhabits channels within ice formations in both the Arctic and Antarctic polar regions, where it plays an important role as a primary producer. Polarella is a thecate dinoflagellate, wherein the cell has an outer covering of cellulose plates, which are arranged in nine latitudinal series. The general morphology of Polarella is similar to that of a typical dinoflagellate. and Polarella has a zygotic life history, wherein it alternates between a motile vegetative phase and a non-motile spiny cyst. While it is thought that the cysts of Polarella have lost their ability to form fossils, the cyst life cycle stage has acted as link to extinct members of the Suessiaceae family.

== Etymology ==
The genus name Polarella is derived from the polar environment, which the holotype inhabits, and the species name glacialis, meaning from the ice, is in reference to how the species inhabits the ice.

== Taxonomy ==
The genus Polarella was first described by Marina Montresor, Gabriele Procaccini, and Diane K. Stoecker as published in the Journal of Phycology in 1999. The dinoflagellate was initially identified from the CCMP 1383 cell culture, a culture that was collected from the McMurdo Sound in the Ross Sea, Antarctica. Montresor et al. (1999) utilized scanning and transmission electron microscopy to examine both the cyst and motile vegetative stages of the dinoflagellate, and identified the presence of a pattern of nine latitudinal plates covering the outside of the vegetative cell. Based on this particular pattern of thecal plates, as well as DNA evidence showing four different insertion or deletion events in the 18S rRNA SSU sequence, which is highly conserved and thus very specific to a given species, between Polarella and species within the closely related genus Symbiodinium, the new genus Polarella was created, and Polarella glacialis was placed within this genus as the only species. Since then, no other species have been added to the genus, however in 2002, Palliani and Riding placed Polarella into the subfamily Umbriadinioideae based on morphological similarities between Polarella and the genus Umbriadinium, a dinoflagellate cyst from the early Jurassic period.

== Habitat and ecology ==
During the formation of ice in the Arctic and Antarctic, channels containing brine are created within the ice, and as the temperature decreases, the salinity of this brine increases. Polarella are known to inhabit these brine-filled channels within Arctic and Antarctic sea-ice. Initially, the type specimen of P. glacialis was sampled from the McMurdo Sound area of the Ross Sea in Antarctica. Following this, P. glacialis was found to have a bipolar distribution, as its presence in the waters of the Canadian Arctic was discovered. A study by Thomson and Wright (2004) then further confirmed the distribution of P. glacialis across Antarctica in samples from Davis Station. Polarella is photoautotrophic, has been found to greatly contribute to the biomass and primary production within the sea-ice brine channels it inhabits, and is present at particularly high densities as it blooms in the austral spring (September to November). Following this period, P. glacialis encysts during the austral summer (December and January). As a phytoflagellate, P. glacialis is often consumed by zooplankton, and as result, P. glacialis plays a key role as a primary producer, creating biomass for use at higher trophic levels within the polar ecosystems.

== Description ==
=== Morphology of vegetative cells ===
Cells of Polarella were described by Montresor et al. (1999). Vegetative cells range from 10-15 μm in length and 6-9 μm in width. These cells have an elongated shape and are somewhat dorsoventrally flattened, with the epitheca being rounded, and the hypotheca being similar in shape to an abbreviated cone. The outside of the cell is smooth, and has a covering of thin polygonal thecal plates consisting of cellulose. Once the outer membrane that surrounds the cell is removed, sutures between the thecal plates become visible. The thecal plates are placed in nine latitudinal rows, with three latitudinal series in the epitheca, two series in the cingulum, and four series in the hypotheca. There is variability in the shape and number of plates across all regions of the cell. The cingulum is deep and wraps around the mid region of the cell, and the sulcus is a shallower indentation, present only through the hypotheca. The transverse flagellum wraps around the cell along the cingulum, and the longitudinal flagellum extends along the sulcus and trails behind the cell. The point where the two flagella meet at the intersection of the cingulum and sulcus is covered by an overhang of the right side of the epitheca.

=== Ultrastructure ===
Although it was not clear in the study by Montresor et al. (1999) whether P. glacialis has a single complex chloroplast with many lobes and a complex pyrenoid, or has many chloroplasts that converge into pyrenoids in the middle of the cell, the overall ultrastructure of the chloroplast was found to be similar to that of other dinoflagellates. There are three membranes on the surface of the chloroplast, and thylakoids in stacks of two or three in a longitudinal orientation. Within the hypotheca, there are several complexly shaped pyrenoids with stalks, and there are no granules of starch stored outside the pyrenoid. An interesting aspect present within the cytoplasm, at the edge of the cell on the ventral side is the refractive body, a structure consisting of four or five vesicles containing crystalline pressed close together. Further, there are several vesicles present throughout the cytoplasm, of which the function is unknown. Also scattered throughout the cytoplasm are many mitochondria. The amphiesma, which is the covering of the cell, consists of one layer of vesicles, under which microtubules may be visible, and is covered by an outer membrane. The Golgi bodies, which form vesicles varying in size, are located posterior to the nucleus. The nucleus, with a dark granular nucleolus within the nuclear stroma, is present within the epitheca, and is large and round.

It has been found by Stephens et al. (2020) that 68% of the genome of Polarella is composed of sequences that are repetitive, specifically with long terminal repeats, which contributes to divergence between species^{7}. Through the examination of the Polarella genome, the function of selection upon an intricate genome to promote adaptations for specific locations was illuminated. Specifically, through duplications of genes in tandem, Polarella glacialis has facilitated an improved ability to survive in polar regions with low temperatures and low light levels. This phenomenon of tandem repeats functions to improve adaptations to polar regions because the transcriptional response surrounding these genes is enhanced and more efficient, allowing for improved expression of these traits.

=== Morphology of cysts ===
A description of the cysts was also provided by Montresor et al. (1999). The cysts of Polarella range in length from 12 to 17 μm, range in width from 8 to 15 μm. They also have a covering of acicular processes (spikes) ranging from 2.7 to 4.2 μm long. The outside of the cyst is covered by a thick wall consisting of an outer layer, an inner layer, a lumen, and a cytoplasmic membrane as the inner most layer. The spikes arise from the outer most layer of the wall surrounding the cyst, and form in the center of polygonal plates. The epitheca has a series of three spikes, and the hypotheca has a series of four spikes. Spikes are absent from the cingulum. Within the cytoplast of the cyst are lobes of a chloroplast, as well as some mitochondria. The cyst also contains the large, round nucleus, beside which is an accumulation of crystalline surrounded by a membrane.

=== Life history ===
As a dinoflagellate, Polarella can undergo both asexual and sexual reproduction, and has a zygotic life history as described by Spector (1984). Asexual reproduction occurs as a haploid motile vegetative cell undergoes binary fission to produce genetically identical haploid daughter cells. During sexual reproduction, the haploid vegetative cell undergoes mitosis to produce haploid gametes, which fuse to form diploid planozygotes. The planozygotes encyst and rest within this stage as a cyst. Upon excystment, the cell undergoes meiosis, returning to the haploid vegetative stage. Vegetative cells will undergo temporary encystment in poor environmental conditions.

=== Distinctive characteristics ===
The only extant members of the Suessiales order are the members of the genera Symbiodinium and Polarella. These closely related genera can be distinguished by the contrasts between their life histories and distributions as discussed by Montresor et al. (1999). Species of Symbiodinium have a life history stage that is coccoid and is an endosymbiont of various invertebrates, and is distributed throughout the oceans in the tropical and subtropical regions. Furthermore, the theca of Symbiodinium species is arranged in series of seven latitudinal plates during its flagellated, motile life stage. In contrast, Polarella glacialis does not act as an endosymbiont, and is instead free living in polar regions. Also distinct from Symbiodinium species, the theca of Polarella has plates in nine latitudinal series. Polarella is also closely related to the extinct genus Umbriadinium, as they have both been placed in the same subfamily Umbriadinioideae. The cysts of the two genera are very similar morphologically, but can be differentiated based on the smaller diameter of Polarella cysts. Additionally, fossils of Umbriadinium are distributed within warm waters, while Polarella is present in freezing polar waters.

== Fossil history ==
The fossil history applicable to Polarella is in relation to its ability to form cysts as discussed by Palliani and Riding (2003). While it is thought that Polarella lost its ability to form cysts that are fossilisable in the early Jurassic period, cysts from this genus have been closely tied to fossils of cysts from extinct dinoflagellates of the Suessiaceae family. These fossilized cysts are thought to be from the Triassic and Jurassic periods. It was through the grouping of fossilized cysts having a series of seven to ten latitudinal plates that the order Suessiales was created.
