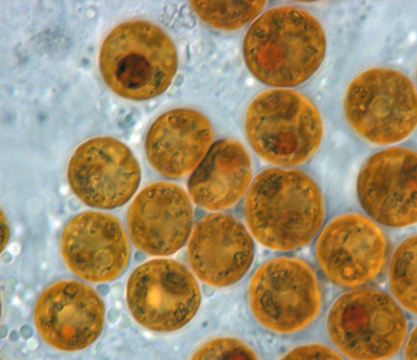
- Symbiodinium

Scientific classification
- Domain: Eukaryota
- Clade: Sar
- Superphylum: Alveolata
- Phylum: Dinoflagellata
- Class: Dinophyceae
- Order: Suessiales
- Family: Symbiodiniaceae; Fensome, Taylor, Norris, Sarjeant, Wharton & Williams, 1993

Genera
- See text

= Symbiodiniaceae =

Family of dinoflagellates (algae)

Symbiodiniaceae is a family of marine dinoflagellates notable for their symbiotic associations with reef-building corals, sea anemones, jellyfish, marine sponges, giant clams, acoel flatworms, and other marine invertebrates. Symbiotic Symbiodiniaceae are sometimes colloquially referred to as Zooxanthellae, though the latter term can be interpreted to include other families of symbiotic algae as well. While many Symbiodiniaceae species are endosymbionts, others are free living in the water column or sediment.

Most symbiotic members of Symbiodiniaceae were previously assigned to the genus Symbiodinium; however, recent genetic analysis has led to a taxonomic reorganization with several former members of Symbiodinium (previously "clades") reassigned to new genera within the Symbiodiniaceae family. Species formerly classified within Symbiodinum Clade A are retained in the Symbiodinium genus.

== Genera ==
There are eleven accepted genera in this family:

- Breviolum
- Cladocopium
- Durusdinium
- Freudenthalidium
- Halluxium
- Miliolidium
- Symbiodinium

Corals and Symbiodiniaceae Corals flourish mostly because of their symbiosis with photosynthetic dinoflagellates from the Symbiodiniaceae family, which live within coral tissues and provide the bulk of the host's energy demands via photosynthesis. This long-standing mutualism is critical to the production and success of reef systems. Genetic and evolutionary data indicate that the Symbiodiniaceae evolved in conjunction with reef-building corals during the Jurassic Period, highlighting their close evolutionary relationships. Although formerly thought to be a single genus, these symbionts are really a heterogeneous set of lineages with varied physiological and ecological characteristics that influence host tolerance to environmental stresses such as temperature changes. Variation among Symbiodiniaceae symbionts can thus dictate coral temperature tolerance and susceptibility to bleaching, highlighting the critical significance of microbial partners in coral survival in a constantly changing environment.
