= Portimine A =

Names
- IUPAC name (3aR,7aS,8S,10R,12S,13S,16R,18S)-10,18-dihydroxy-12-methyl-6-vinyl-2,3,4,5,7a,8,10,11,12,13,14,15,17,18-tetradecahydro-9H-8,16:13,16-diepoxybenzo[2,3]cyclotetradeca[1,2-b]pyrrol-9-one

Identifiers
3D model (JSmol)	Interactive image
ChEMBL	ChEMBL4467341
ChemSpider	30771030
PubChem CID	72197887
- InChI: InChI=1S/C23H31NO5/c1-3-14-4-6-22-8-9-24-21(22)17(26)12-23-7-5-18(28-23)13(2)10-16(25)19(27)20(29-23)15(22)11-14/h3,11,13,15-18,20,25-26H,1,4-10,12H2,2H3/t13-,15+,16+,17-,18-,20-,22+,23+/m0/s1 Key: JYQBXOZZPLFICX-CPWUQFAPSA-N
- SMILES: C[C@H]1C[C@H](C(=O)[C@@H]2[C@H]3C=C(CC[C@@]34CCN=C4[C@H](C[C@]5(O2)CC[C@@H]1O5)O)C=C)O

Properties
Chemical formula	C_{23}H_{31}NO_{5}
Molar mass	401.503 g·mol^{−1}
- Except where otherwise noted, data are given for materials in their standard state (at 25 °C [77 °F], 100 kPa). Infobox references

Portimine A is a cyclic imine natural product produced by the dinoflagellate microalgae Vulcanodinium rugosum. It is a drug lead due to its anti-cancer activity. It seemingly inhibits ribosomal translation activity through an interaction with NMD3, leading to activation of the inflammasome. It is suspected to be causal toxin behind an severe inflammatory skin disease in Senegalese fishermen in 2020 and 2021.
