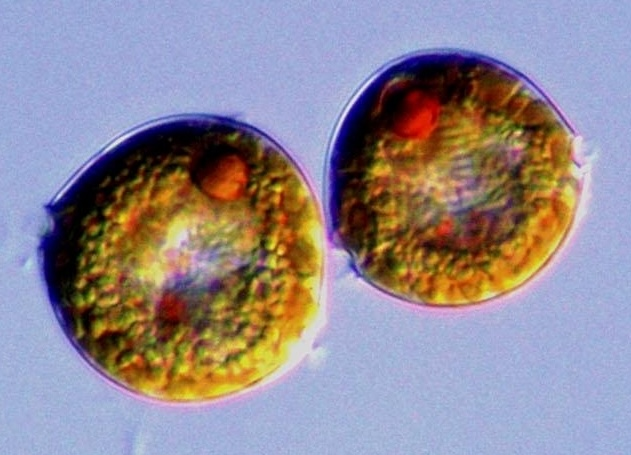
- Durinskia baltica

Scientific classification
- Domain: Eukaryota
- Clade: Sar
- Clade: Alveolata
- Phylum: Dinoflagellata
- Class: Dinophyceae
- Order: Peridiniales
- Family: Kryptoperidiniaceae; Er.Lindemann

= Kryptoperidiniaceae =

Kryptoperidiniaceae is a family of dinoflagellates belonging to the order Peridiniales.

Genera:

- Blixaea Gottschling
- Durinskia S.Carty & E.R.Cox
- Unruhdinium Gottschling
