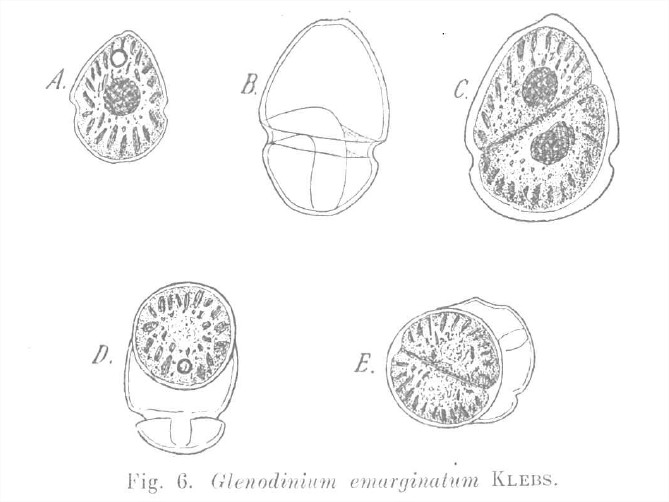
- Glenodinium emarginatum

Scientific classification
- Domain: Eukaryota
- Clade: Sar
- Clade: Alveolata
- Phylum: Dinoflagellata
- Class: Dinophyceae
- Order: Peridiniales
- Genus: Glenodinium; Ehrenberg

= Glenodinium =

Genus of single-celled organisms

Glenodinium is a genus of dinoflagellates with unknown classification.

The genus was first described by Christian Gottfried Ehrenberg in 1836.

Species:

- Glenodinium foliaceum
- Glenodinium oculatum
- Glenodinium paululum
