= Suessiales =

Scientific classification
- Domain: Eukaryota
- Clade: Sar
- Superphylum: Alveolata
- Phylum: Dinoflagellata
- Class: Dinophyceae
- Order: Suessiales; Fensome, Taylor, Norris, Sarjeant, Wharton & Williams, 1993

Families
- Biecheleriaceae; Borghiellaceae; Suessiaceae; Symbiodiniaceae

Order of single-celled organisms

Suessiales is an order of dinoflagellates.

It includes Borghiella, Glenodinium, Polarella and Symbiodiniaceae.
