= Multilocus genotype =

Combination of alleles in more than one place

A multilocus genotype is the combination of alleles found at two or more loci in a single individual.

For example, in a diploid species, if there are two SNP loci and the first locus has alleles A and G, while the second locus has alleles T and C, the multilocus genotype can be represented as {A/G,T/C}. If the genome is not haploid then the multilocus genotype does not necessarily determine which alleles co-occur on chromosomes. In the example, if the two loci are located on the same chromosome the possibilities are either {A-T,G-C} or {A-C,G-T}. Where A-T represents a haplotype with alleles A and T together on one chromosome and G and C together on the other. If the haplotypes are determined the multilocus genotype is referred to as a phased genotype, otherwise it is referred to as unphased. Some authors suggest that the term multilocus genotype should only be applied to phased multilocus data while others apply it to unphased multilocus data as well. The combination of alleles at two or more loci on a single chromosome make up a haplotype and the two haplotypes in a diploid individual make up the diplotype (a synonym for a phased multilocus genotype).
