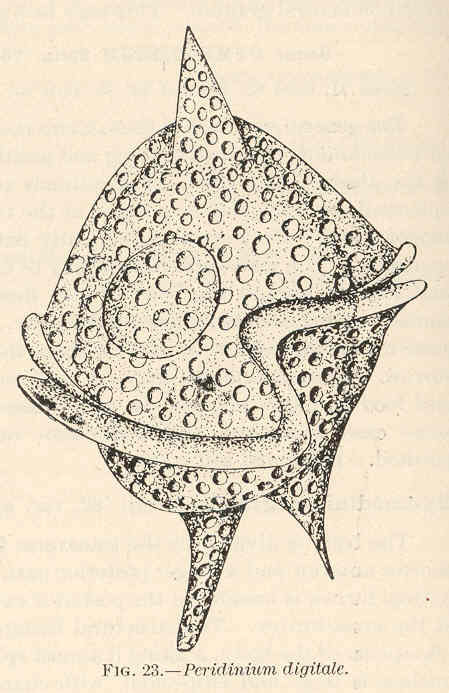
- Peridinium digitale

Scientific classification
- Domain: Eukaryota
- Clade: Sar
- Clade: Alveolata
- Division: Dinoflagellata
- Class: Dinophyceae
- Order: Peridiniales; Haeckel, 1894

= Peridiniales =

Order of single-celled organisms

Peridiniales is an order of dinoflagellates.

== Families ==
Species accepted by the World Register of Marine Species as of December 2023:

- Archaesphaerodiniopsidaceae
- Centrodiniaceae
- Ceratocorythaceae Lindemann, 1928
- Ceratoperidiniaceae
- Congruentidiaceae Schiller, 1935
- Crypthecodiniaceae Biecheler ex Chatton, 1952
- Deflandreaceae Eisenack, 1954 †
- Dinosphaeraceae Lindemann, 1928
- Glenodiniaceae
- Glenodiniopsidaceae Schiller, 1935
- Heterocapsaceae R.A. Fensome, F.J.R. Taylor, G. Norris, W.A.S. Sarjeant, D.I. Wharton & G.L. Williams
- Kolkwitziellaceae
- Kryptoperidiniaceae Er.Lindemann, 1925
- Lessardiaceae Carbonell-Moore, 2004
- Oxytoxaceae Lindemann, 1928
- Peridiniaceae Ehrenberg, 1831
- Peridiniopsidaceae Gottschling, Kretschmann & Zerdoner Casalan, 2017
- Phthanoperidiniaceae
- Podolampaceae
- Podolampadaceae Lindemann, 1928
- Protoperidiniaceae J.P. Bujak & E.H. Davies
- Thecadiniaceae
