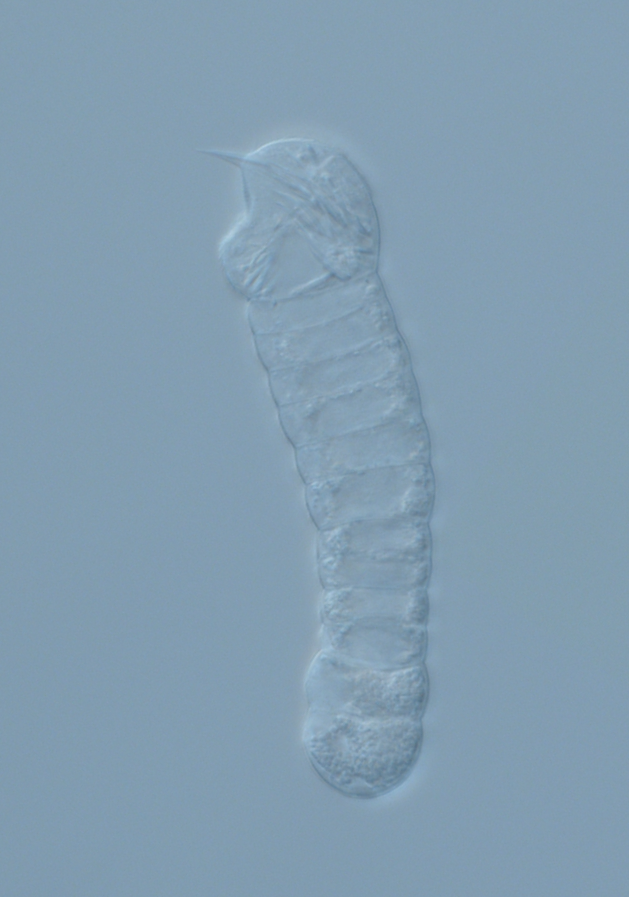
- Light micrograph of Haplozoon axiothellae in its trophont stage

Scientific classification
- Domain: Eukaryota
- Supergroup: Alveolata
- Division: Dinoflagellata
- Class: Dinophyceae
- Order: Peridiniales
- Family: Haplozoonaceae; Poche
- Genus: Haplozoon; Dogiel

= Haplozoon =

Genus of single-celled organisms

Haplozoon (/hæploʊ'zoʊən/) are unicellular endo-parasites, primarily infecting maldanid polychaetes. They belong to Dinoflagellata but differ from typical dinoflagellates. Most dinoflagellates are free-living and possess two flagella. Instead, Haplozoon belong to a 5% minority of parasitic dinoflagellates that are not free-living. Additionally, the Haplozoon trophont stage is particularly unique due to an apparent lack of flagella. The presence of flagella or remnant structures is the subject of ongoing research.

At first glance, Haplozoon also do not appear unicellular – in fact they were originally classified as a possible transitional stage between protists and multicellular organisms. They have more recently been classified as compartmentalized syncytia – single cells with multiple nuclei that have been subdivided by internal membranes. Their life cycle is also largely unknown; while there is a well-observed adult trophont stage, understanding of other life stages is speculative at best.

There is a single published case of Haplozoon infecting an appendicularian. Otherwise, they are almost exclusively documented as infecting Maldanidae, and the extent to which they are an appendicularian parasite has not been investigated.

== Etymology ==
Haplozoon derives from two Greek words: haploos meaning "single, or simple" and zoion meaning "animal". When they were first discovered, they were initially placed within Mesozoa, a group of highly reduced worm-like parasitic invertebrates. Therefore, the genus name Haplozoon means "simple animal".

== History of knowledge ==
The type species Haplozoon armatum was discovered by Russian zoologist Valentin Dogiel in 1906. Dogiel initially described Haplozoon as belonging to the Mesozoa, and established a new mesozoan class, the Catenata.

A series of early protistologists continued to fine-tune the taxonomical position of Haplozoon for a number of years. The following year, the French biologist Édouard Chatton indicated similarities between Haplozoon and Blastodinium in 1907. Later, in 1911, the German naturalist Franz Poche created a new protozoan class – the Haplozooidea. And again in 1920, Chatton created a new family (Haplozoonidae) for the genus, of the order Gymnodinida (modern syn. Gymnodiniales). By the 1970s Haplozoon had been moved from the Gymnodiniales to the order Blastodiniales.

Our modern understanding of Haplozoon is limited. There were a series of species discoveries in the early 1900s, however these publications lack the modern techniques that would be mandatory today (e.g. transmission electron microscopy, scanning electron microscope, molecular sequencing, etc.). Only 5 species of Haplozoon have been sufficiently described by modern standards: Haplozoon axiothellae, Haplozoon praxillellae, Haplozoon ezoense, Haplozoon gracile, and Haplozoon pugnus.

In some cases, insufficient information has resulted nomen nudum. This is the case for H. inerme, and H. hirsutum. In many cases, species of Haplozoon are also phantom species. Phantom species are those that were perhaps adequately described at first, but have not been seen since their initial discovery.

The three types of haplozoan compartments were originally named with the suffix -cyte (trophocyte, gonocyte, and sporocyte). Within biology, the -cyte suffix historically denotes different cell types (osteocyte, lipocyte, erythrocyte). Because Haplozoon were thought to be multicellular when originally described, the haplozoan compartments were named as if they are separate cells. When it was determined that Haplozoon were not multicellular, and in fact a compartmentalized syncytium, the three compartments were renamed with the suffix -mere (trophomere, gonomere, sporomere), to accurately portray them as belonging to a single cell.

== Habitat and ecology ==
Haplozoon are obligate parasites. They are almost exclusively found in the gut of maldanid marine worms, with one study documenting a Haplozoon parasite infecting an appendicularian. Each trophont has a stylet, which it uses to pierce the gut lining of the host worm. It is unclear if the stylet is used only for anchoring the parasite, or if it is involved in feeding as well. If Haplozoon do use their stylet to feed, this would be referred to as myzocytosis, and commonly referred to as "cellular vampirism". This is an established feeding method among other alveolate parasites.

Another possible feeding strategy is that the parasite absorbs nutrients that are released as the host worm digests food. This feeding strategy is referred to as pinocytosis, a form of endocytosis where nutrients suspended in the fluid if the host's gut are absorbed through the cell membrane of the parasite. The exterior of Haplozoon cells are covered by barbs that present as fine hair-like structures that might function in surface mediated nutrition similar to the microtriches of cestoda.

With few exceptions, most descriptions of Haplozoon are from European coastlines. Haplozoon clymenellae is from the Atlantic coast of North America, while H. axiothellae, and H. praxillellae have been found on the Pacific coast of Washington, US and British Columbia, Canada. H. ezoense, H. gracile, and H. pugnus were discovered on the coast of Japan. There are currently no recorded observations from the tropics or the southern hemisphere, and consequently little is known about its biogeographical distribution.

== Description of the organism ==
=== Morphology ===
What makes Haplozoon unique among dinoflagellates is their functional multicellularity. H. axiothellae cells are composed of a series of compartments, which give them the appearance of multicellularity. At minimum all Haplozoon species consist of a single row of compartments, with mature cells of some species containing two or more rows of compartments at the posterior of their cell. These compartments are specialized for different functions, such as host attachment, feeding and reproduction. Haplozoon were originally described as having 2-26 "cells", however the degree of compartmentalization varies by species. Species also vary in size, but the most well-studied (H. axiothellae) is described as being 40-175 μm in length, and 15-40 μm wide. The exterior of Haplozoon cells are covered in amphiesmal projections (syn. thecal barbs).

The Haplozoon trophont (i.e. the stage that parasitizes the host) has 3 types of compartments: (1) a trophomere used to attach to the host, (2) repeating gonomeres that compose the majority of the cell length, and (3) sporomeres which develop from mature gonomeres. The anterior-most compartment of the cell is the trophomere, larger than the gonomeres that are immediately posterior to it. The rear most compartments are referred to as sporomeres, and depending on the species of Haplozoon, sporomeres may remain in single file (e.g. H. lineare), form double rows (e.g. H. axiothellae) or even multiple rows (e.g. H. clymenellae). All three compartment types appear granular under light microscopy, due to starch granules in their cytoplasm. In H. axiothellae, cytoplasic granularity increase from anterior to posterior, concentrating in the sporomeres. It is thought that starch accumulation in the sporomeres provides a reserve of energy for a subsequent life stage to survive in a marine environment without a host.

Haplozoon lack visible flagella, where traditional dinoflagellates have two – one transverse and one longitudinal. However, H. axiothellae possesses a longitudinal row of ventral pores along their surface, and confocal scanning laser microscopy (CLSM) data have revealed two basal bodies embedded in the plasma membrane of each compartment. These basal bodies are found along the cell's ventral surface, aligned with the cell's ventral pores. Taken together, these data indicate that Haplozoon possess the vestiges of the flagellar system present in most dinoflagellates. This is consistent with the prediction of a subsequent life stage possessing flagella, because eukaryotic flagella require basal bodies to anchor and organize flagellar microtubules. CLSM data also show that the microtubules of the cytoskeleton originate from these basal bodies, and function as microtubule organizing centers.

The trophomere attaches to the gut lining of the host by means of its stylet and adhesive disc. Some species of Haplozoon possess a single stylet (H. ezoense), whereas others are known to have multiple (reserve) stylets within the trophomere (H. axiothellae, H. praxillellae). Some species also appear to have "arms" that extend from the trophomere. CLSM data reveal a basket of microtubules lining the interior of the trophomere. This basket of microtubules provides the cytoskeletal structure that supports the dynamic movement and behavior of the trophomere, with microtubules especially concentrated in the adhesive disk.

Early transmission electron microscopy (TEM) briefly describes 3 layers of the cellular membrane. They describe a single continuous outer layer equivalent to a cell membrane, with two subsequent layers below of compressed "thecal vesicles". Today these "thecal vesicles" are known as alveoli, or amphiesmal vesicles. The divisions between gonomeres are described as outer continuous membranes and flattened vesicles but pressed so closely together that they are impossible to distinguish. The divisions between compartments are now understood to be created by interlocking amphiesmal vesicles rather than cellular membranes. This solidified the description of Haplozoon as compartmentalized syncytia, rather than multicellular organisms. However, there is evidence of eventual plasma membrane formation at the rear of the cell, where plasma membrane appears to form along the layers of alveoli separating compartments. This indicates that sporomeres do eventually develop their own plasma membranes through cytokinesis, which would be necessary for sporomeres to break away and survive independently from the adult trophont.

All compartments contain their own nuclei, with some gonomeres being binucleate and some sporomeres being quadrinucleate. Nuclei are nearly always in some stage of division, with robust spindle fibres present in virtually all of them. The nuclei of Haplozoon have thick chromosomes, typical of Dinokaryota. Mitochondria are mainly located below the amphiesmal vesicles towards the outside of the cell and possess tubular cristae.

TEM sections have revealed multiple triple membrane-bound organelles within the gonomeres. They are roughly spherical and range in size from 200 nm – 750 nm. They appear like relic non-photosynthetic plastids, which have been found among other members of Myzozoa (apicomplexans as well as dinoflagellates). This is consistent with our understanding that some lineages of dinoflagellates have experienced plastid loss as they evolved. This discovery in Haplozoon only provides ultrastructure evidence for these remnant plastids; no research has been published to assess plastid genes and any associated metabolic pathways.

=== Life cycle ===
Very little is confirmed about the Haplozoon life cycle; the only life-stage that is known is the trophont. Given similarities with other dinoflagellate parasites, it is hypothesized that the known trophont stage is the "adult".

It is presumed that the sporomeres are what allow the organism to reproduce, but this has not been shown definitively. It is well-documented that sporomeres eventually detach from the trophont, thought to be released through the anus of the host, and into the marine environment where the sporomere would become a motile life stage that has yet to be described. Once in the marine environment, the dinospores can be ingested by a new host, and subsequently develop into an adult trophont and attach themselves to the gut of their new host.

Dinospores were described in Haplozoon dogieli. Sporomeres were observed detaching from adult trophonts and developing into small flagellated dinospores. They were 12 μm in length and similar to the dinospores of Oodinium, Apodinium, and Blastodinium. These dinospores were also observed quickly encysting if disturbed. Subsequent studies have been unable to reproduce any dinospore or cyst life stages, and so no image data for these stages currently exists. While the existence of dinospores is likely, they have not been observed since 1924.

== Phylogeny ==
As of June 2023, molecular data exists for five Haplozoon species: H. axiothellae, H. praxillellae, H. ezoense, H. gracile, and H. pugnus. Modern dinoflagellate phylogenies recognize 8 orders: Syndiniales, Gymnodiniales, Noctilucales, Suessiales, Peridiniales, Gonyaulacales, Prorocentrales, and Dinophysiales. But this has not always been the case – early in the study of dinoflagellates, other orders were used such as Blastodiniales.

Originally, Blastodiniales was a group for all parasitic dinoflagellates. Through the years, Blastodiniales has fallen out of favour and use. Subsequent phylogenetic analyses have confirmed that Blastodiniales is a polyphyletic group, whose existence is not supported by modern molecular data. There is a history of former members of Blastodiniales being moved to new orders based on molecular data.

Beyond being dinoflagellates, 18S phylogenetic analyses failed to resolve the position of Haplozoon. Therefore, Haplozoon remain in the polyphyletic order Blastodiniales, awaiting conclusive molecular data that confirms its true phylogenetic position. In 2023, a collaborative group of Canadian and Japanese researchers used transcriptomics to finally resolve the phylogenic position of Haplozoon, placing them within the Peridiniales.

The following species are known to exist:

- H. armatum, Dogiel, 1906 (host: Travisia forbesi)
- H. lineare, Dogiel, 1907 (host: Clymene lumbricalis)
- H. delicatulum, Dogiel, 1910 (Host: maldanid, gen sp?)
- H. ariciae, Dogiel, 1910 (host: Aricia norvegica)
- H. macrostylum, Dogiel, 1910 (host: maldanid, gen sp?)
- H. obscurum, Dogiel, 1910 (host: Terebellides strömii)
- H. clymenellae, Calkins, 1915 (host: Clymenella torquata)
- H. clymenidis, Dogiel & Mikelsson, 1923 (host: Euclymene palermitana)
- H. tuberculatum, Dogiel & Mikelsson 1923 (host: maldanid gen sp?)
- H. villosum, Dogiel & Mikelsson 1923 (host: Polyphysia crassa, formerly Eumenia crassa)
- H. dogielii, Shumway, 1924 (host: Leiochone clypeata)
- H. inerme, Cachon 1964 (host: Appendicularia sicula)
- H. axiothellae, Siebert, 1973 (host: Axiothellae rubrocincta)
- H. praxillellae, Rueckert and Leander, 2008 (host: Praxillella pacifica)
- H. ezoense, Wakeman, 2018 (host: Praxillella pacifica)
- H.gracile Yamamoto, 2020 (host: cf. Petaloclymene sp.)
- H.pugnus Yamamoto, 2020 (host: Nicomache personata, Nicomache sp.)
