= Coccidinium =

Scientific classification
- Domain: Eukaryota
- (unranked): SAR
- (unranked): Alveolata
- Phylum: Dinoflagellata
- Class: Syndiniophyceae
- Order: Coccidiniales
- Family: Coccidiniaceae
- Genus: Coccidinium Chatton & Biecheler, 1934

Type species
- Coccidinium duboscquii

Species
- Coccidinium duboscquii; Coccidinium legeri; Coccidinium mesnili; Coccidinium punctatum

Genus of single-celled organisms

Coccidinium is a genus of parasitic syndinian dinoflagellates that infect the nucleus and cytoplasm of other marine dinoflagellates. Coccidinium, along with two other dinoflagellate genera, Amoebophrya and Duboscquella, contain species that are the primary endoparasites of marine dinoflagellates. While numerous studies have been conducted on the genus Amoebophrya, specifically Amoebophrya ceratii, little is known about Coccidinium. These microscopic organisms have gone relatively unstudied after the initial observations of Édouard Chatton and Berthe Biecheler in 1934 and 1936.

The first species of Coccidinium that were described were C. legeri and C. duboscquii, found in the cytoplasm of dinoflagellates in brackish waters near Sète, France. They have been noted as lacking photosynthetic stages in their life cycles, which is to be expected given their parasitic nature. Sexual reproduction has been observed "time and again" in C. mesnili as stated by Chatton and Biecheler.

== History of knowledge ==
First discovered by Édouard Chatton and Berthe Biecheler in 1934, Coccidinium was initially observed in the cytoplasm of the dinoflagellates Glenodinium sociale and Peridinium sp., both taken from the waters of Sète. They identified two species of Coccidinium, C. legeri and C. duboscquii. In 1936, C. mesnili and C. punctatum were added to the list of existing Coccidinium species by Chatton and Biecheler. They were found in the same brackish waters of Sète, but in two other peridinians: Kryptoperidinium foliaceum and Coolia monotis respectively.

== Etymology ==
Observations of Coccidinium showed that they were coccidian-like in their vegetative and replication stages, but their dinospores, a biflagellate zoospore, resembled syndinian dinoflagellates. Chatton and Biecheler therefore gave this new genera of endoparasitic dinoflagellates the name of Coccidinium.

== Morphology ==
A complete understanding of Coccidinium morphology is not yet possible due to insufficient research. There are no other studies completed apart from the initial observations conducted by Chatton & Biecheler in 1934 and 1936, therefore the little information known are based on their descriptions.

In C. duboscquii, the trophozoite, the feeding form of the parasite, is present in two forms that originate from small uninucleate forms found in close contact with the nucleus of the host and that are distinguished by their load in carbohydrate globules. In the first form, heavy, numerous and large starchy matter are present whereas in the second form this is absent or rare. Recent interpretation of those uninucleate forms without starch grains suspect that they might be the parasite Parvilucifera.

Sporocyte nuclei are large and spherical, with around 4-5 chromosomes in total in a general V-shape, which is typical for Syndiniales. The nuclei lie around the periphery of the cell. Dinospore movement is via flagellar locomotion. In the forms rich with starch grains, these parasites grow for extended periods of time with a single nucleus, which Chatton and Biecheler term as "synenergid". They will surround themselves with a thin cystic membrane before undergoing division, but will not exceed 16 or 32 nuclei.

In C. legeri, two stages are also observed. The first form consists of small plasmodia that contain a maximum of 8 nuclei, which are assumed to give rise to dinospores. The second form consists of Coccidinium multiplying rapidly inside the host, however the nucleus does not undergo division until after the death of the host and the encystment of the parasite in its remains.

Coccidinium are haplontic, meaning that for the majority of their life cycle they are haploid. Reproduction can occur either asexually or sexually. Sexual reproduction has been clearly observed in 1934 when Chatton and Biecheler witnessed a two-by-two fusion of imperceptibly dissimilar spores from separate organisms of C. mesnilii, resulting in a mobile zygote with two pairs of flagella. The zygotes form a hyaline cyst.

== Practical importance ==
Parasitism in organisms usually implies ecological and human economic repercussions, but in the case of Coccidinium, these repercussions carry relatively little importance in the ecology of host organisms from an anthropocentric point of view. Unless the host species is commercially significant, studies conducted on parasitic dinoflagellates are few and far between, therefore not much is known about the ecological importance of Coccidinium specifically.

== Habitat and ecology ==
Coccidinium are endophytic, therefore live inside other organisms for the majority of their life. They tend to parasitize other dinoflagellates, thus are often found in aquatic environments, ranging from freshwater to marine. Coccidinium are able to inhabit environments with variable salinity levels as a result, though the exact range is not known due to insufficient research.

Coccidinium, while carrying little relevance to humans, contain species that have other marine dinoflagellates as hosts and therefore are relevant to these protists. There are often clear examples of sudden outbreaks of parasitism by specific dinoflagellates in a short time period, leading to a sudden decrease in zooplankton population density, implying that parasitic dinoflagellates can create fluctuations in marine plankton. There is insufficient information however regarding the parasitism process in Coccidinium, such as how the sporozoite enters the host and its specific effects on the dinoflagellate population. What is clear though is that the initial infection site is inside the nucleus of the host. Juvenile trophozoite generally lie close to the host's nucleus, where it will undergo growth through the consumption of either the nucleus and chromosomes, or cytoplasm, depending on the species. The trophozoite will depress the host's nucleus before infecting and destroying it, though the exact mechanism is yet to be known. Throughout this growth process, the host has been described as still motile, but the entire digestion of the nucleus and/or cytoplasm is relatively rapid, around 24 hours, therefore this motility can be described as short lived.
