= Apodinium floodi =

Scientific classification
- Domain: Eukaryota
- Clade: Diaphoretickes
- Clade: SAR
- Clade: Alveolata
- Phylum: Myzozoa
- Superclass: Dinoflagellata
- Class: Dinophyceae
- Order: Blastodiniales
- Family: Apodiniaceae
- Genus: Apodinium
- Species: A. floodi

Binomial name
- Apodinium floodi N. McLean & C.P. Galt

Species of single-celled organism

Apodinium floodi is an ectoparasitic dinoflagellate found in the vicinity of northwest Washington, USA. Its host is the sea squirt Oikopleura labradoriensis. Trophozoites of A. floodi are encased by membrane and divisions of young trophozoites produce a single file of sporogenic cells. Divisions occur perpendicular to this axis, and eventually the spores are produced. A. floodi attaches to its host with a peduncle, which it penetrates into the larvacean tunicate's musculature, reaching the notochord. Two principle rhizoids penetrate the outer region of the notochord, presumably to absorb nutrients from O. labradoriensis blood.
