= Blastodinium =

Scientific classification
- Domain: Eukaryota
- Supergroup: Alveolata
- Division: Dinoflagellata
- Class: Dinophyceae
- Order: Blastodiniales
- Family: Blastodinidae
- Genus: Blastodinium; Chatton, 1906

Genus of single-celled organisms

Blastodinium is a diverse genus of dinoflagellates and important parasites of planktonic copepods. They exist in either a parasitic stage, a trophont stage, and a dinospore stage. Although morphologically and functionally diverse, as parasites they live exclusively in the intestinal tract of copepods.

== Etymology ==
Blastodinium is made up of the Greek prefix ‘blasto-’, meaning to germ/bud. This likely refers to its dinospore stage following Blasdotinium reproduction, where sporocytes appear to bud out of a cuticle.

== History of knowledge ==
The Blastodinium taxonomy is entirely based on their morphology at the trophont stage with B. pruvoti being the type species of the group. In 1920, Chatton proposed 3 main groups which are consistent with today's molecular data; Spinoulsum, Contorum, and Mangini. Upon their discovery, it was recognized that Blastodinium organisms had features that distinguished them from the majority of dinoflagellates in the Dinophyceae class. These include their parasitic lifestyle and the lack of histones in their temporary dinokaryon (dinospore) stage. Thus, the genus was placed in a separate class, Blastodiniphyceae, which contained the single order, Blastodiniales. However, the Blastodinium’s dinospore's thecal plate pattern is still noticeably similar to the thecal patterning on dinophyceae dinoflagellates, highlighting the close relationship between the lineages.

Blastodinium exhibit the two features that link all members of the Blastodiniale order; a parasitic life mode and the presence of a temporary dinokaryon at some life cycle stage. However, Blastodinium classification as a monophyletic group is only moderately supported, as small subunit rDNA sequences between some of the genus's species have a relatively large difference.

== Habitat and ecology ==
Blastodinium live most of their life as parasites in the guts of marine planktonic copepods. Although some Blastodinium species are capable of photosynthesis through the copepod's transparent gut, they acquire most of its nutrients from their host.

Blastodinium infection only occurs in juvenile copepods or adult females, since infected male juveniles are unable to molt into an adult stage. When infected, castration of female copepods is commonly observed, along with a general reduction in copepod size and survival. This is likely due to food limitations from the blocked alimentary tract and the added competition against the protist for organic matter.

== Morphology ==
Blastodinium are typically motile and bi-flagellated. These organisms exhibit three life stages; a parasitic stage (also known as trophocyte), a trophont stage, and a sporocyte (dinospore) stage. Most trophonts and dinospores are greenish brown in color, indicating the presence of a plastid. These stages also have thecal plates, which contain trichocyst pores scattered along the surface.

Trophocytes are binucleated and have large Golgi apparati composed of many dictyosomes. Instead of fully functioning chloroplasts, they possess etioplasts and small underdeveloped plastids. Thus, trophocytes perform limited photosynthesis despite being highly metabolically active. Unlike the typical dinoflagellate morphology, trophocytes are multicellular and composed of hundreds of non-flagellated cells. Sometimes, young trophocytes possess an anterior beak, although its function is unknown.

The trophont stage is a multicellular growth stage, composed of many individual cells wrapped by a cellulosic layer.

Dinospores are free-swimming flagellates that exhibit the typical morphology of dinoflagellates. Although initially binucleated, they later divide into four uni-nucleated dinospores. They have clear thecal plates with a dense covering of papillae. They are ellipsoid in shape and have well-developed plastids located at the cell's periphery.

=== Nucleus ===
Blastodinium have a dinokaryon nucleus, characterized by a lack of histones and permanently condense chromosomes. Blastodinium perform closed mitosis, in which their nuclear envelope remains intact to aid in the orientation and segregation of chromosomes. Mitosis does not involve kinetochores or centrioles, as their chromosomes are attached to the inner membrane. During asexual reproduction, their mitosis stages follow one another in the absence of interphase.

== Life cycle ==
The infection cycle first starts with the ingestion of a free-swimming dinospore by a copepod. Rather than being digested, the dinospore grows and developed into a parasitic trophocyte. At this stage, it takes residence in the copepod's gut lumen, where it competes for nutrients and organic matter.

Following infection, the trophocyte will engage in asexual reproduction by palintomy. During this, the trophocyte divides via binary fission into a secondary trophocyte and a germ cell. The germ cell will then divide into many sporocytes. The secondary trophocyte may divide into a tertiary trophocyte and another germ cell, which may then produce a second layer of sporocytes. These repeated binary fissions continue in the absence of an intermediate growth stage, to get multiple layers of the multicellular growth that is the trophont. All of this occurs within a common cuticle, whose rupture results in the release of sporocytes through the copepod anus and into the environment. Although initially non-motile, sporocytes later develop a flagellum and take on the general morphology of a typical dinoflagellate.

== Species ==
- Blastodinium apsteini
- Blastodinium chattoni
- Blastodinium contortum
- Blastodinium crissum
- Blastodinium elongatum
- Blastodinium galatheanum
- Blastodinium hyalinum
- Blastodinium inornatum
- Blastodinium mangini
- Blastodinium navicula
- Blastodinium oviforme
- Blastodinium pruvoti
- Blastodinium spinulosum
