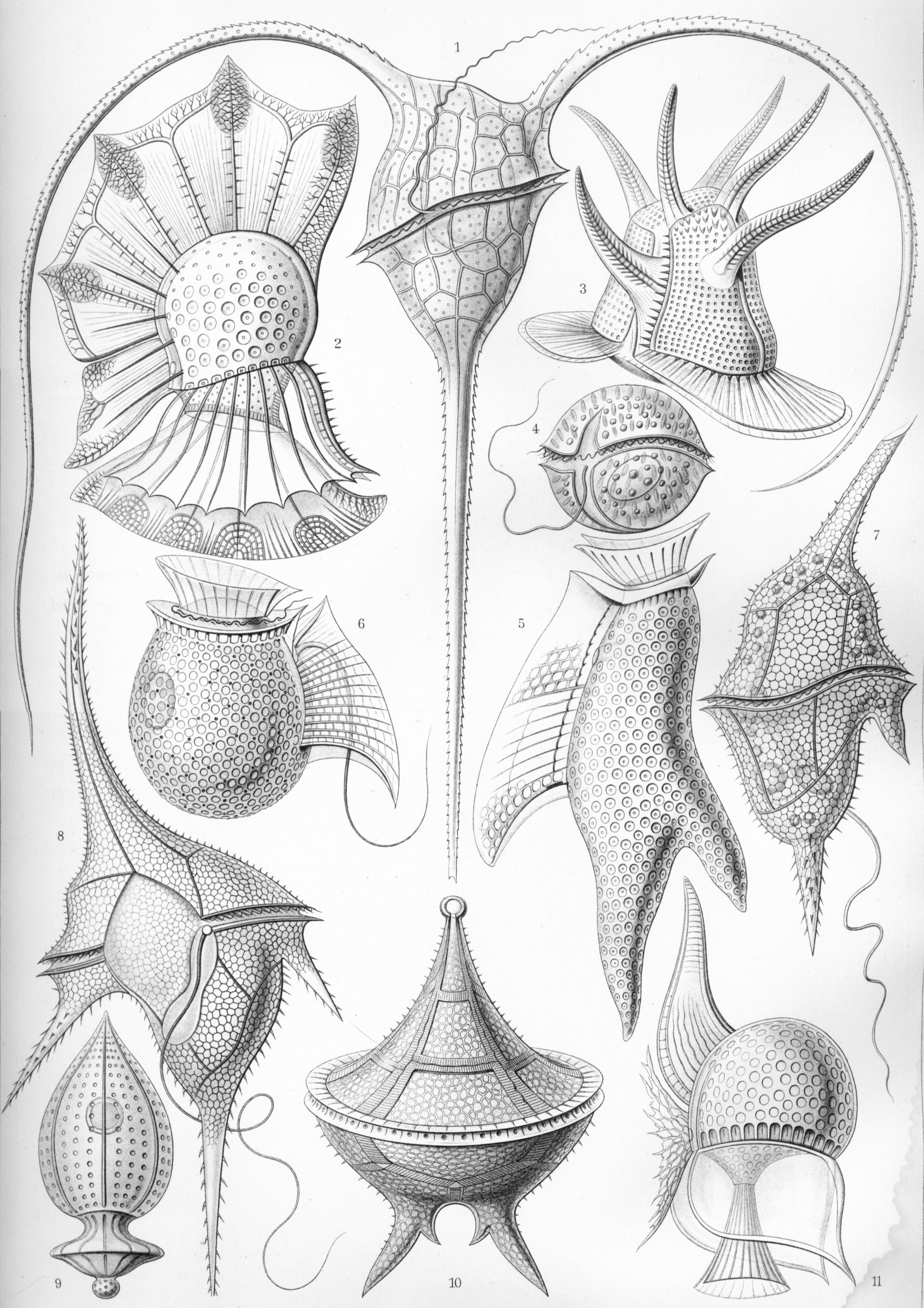
- "Peridinea" from Ernst Haeckel's Kunstformen der Natur, 1904

Scientific classification
- Domain: Eukaryota
- (unranked): SAR
- (unranked): Alveolata
- Phylum: Dinoflagellata
- Superclass: Dinokaryota Cavalier-Smith, 1993

= Dinokaryota =

Superclass of single-celled organisms

Dinokaryota is a main grouping of dinoflagellates. They include all species where the nucleus remains a dinokaryon throughout the entire cell cycle, which is typically dominated by the haploid stage. All the "typical" dinoflagellates, such as Peridinium and Gymnodinium, belong here. Others are more unusual, including some that are colonial, amoeboid, or parasitic. Symbiodinium contains the symbiotic zooxanthellae.

The non-photosynthetic members are believed to derive from photosynthetic ancestors.

== Classification ==
Dinoflagellates are classified by morphology.

=== With a theca ===
Species with a theca are divided into four orders, based on the arrangement of the armor plates:

- Dinophysiales - e.g. Dinophysis
- Gonyaulacales - e.g. Ceratium, Gonyaulax
- Peridiniales - e.g. Peridinium
- Prorocentrales - e.g. Prorocentrum

The Peridiniales are probably paraphyletic to the others, and on rRNA trees they are mixed with the species that lack thecae. The other three orders are probably monophyletic, with the Dinophysiales and Prorocentrales as close relatives, united by the presence of a sagittal suture dividing the theca in two.

However, on rRNA trees the Prorocentrales are split up.

=== Without theca ===
The groups of dinoflagellates without theca are understood to be artificial, and are mostly polyphyletic. Many of the genera, such as Gymnodinium and Amphidinium, are also polyphyletic. However some may approximate monophyletic groups, such as the Suessiales, and some have not been studied phylogenetically.

- Gymnodiniales - e.g. Gymnodinium, Amphidinium
- Ptychodiscales
- Suessiales - e.g. Symbiodinium
- Desmocapsales
- Phytodiniales (includes Dinococcales, Dinotrichales) - e.g. Dinamoeba, Pfiesteria
- Thoracosphaerales

=== Blastodiniales ===
There is also a group of parasitic dinoflagellates, the Blastodiniales, that do not have dinokarya during their trophic stage. Because of this, they have been treated as a separate class Blastodiniphyceae, but some or all may actually have developed within the Dinophyceae.
