= Mesoporos =

Scientific classification
- Domain: Eukaryota
- Clade: Diaphoretickes
- Clade: SAR
- Clade: Alveolata
- Phylum: Myzozoa
- Superclass: Dinoflagellata
- Class: Dinophyceae
- Order: Prorocentrales
- Family: Prorocentraceae
- Genus: Mesoporos; L.C.Lillick

Genus of protists

Mesoporos is a genus of dinoflagellates belonging to the family Prorocentraceae.

There are two currently accepted species in the genus Mesoporos:

- Mesoporos parthasarathicus Subrahmanyan
- Mesoporos perforatus (Gran) Lillick
