= DVNP =

- Death Valley National Park
- Dinoflagellate viral nucleoprotein
