= Actiniscus =

Scientific classification
- Domain: Eukaryota
- Clade: Diaphoretickes
- Clade: SAR
- Clade: Alveolata
- Phylum: Myzozoa
- Superclass: Dinoflagellata
- Class: Dinophyceae
- Order: Gymnodiniales
- Family: Actiniscaceae
- Genus: Actiniscus; Ehrenberg

Genus of single-celled organisms

Actiniscus is a genus of dinoflagellate belonging to the family Actiniscaceae.

The genus was first described by Christian Gottfried Ehrenberg in 1843.

Species:

- Actiniscus pentasterias (Ehrenberg) Ehrenberg
