= Euduboscquella =

Scientific classification
- Domain: Eukaryota
- Clade: Diaphoretickes
- Clade: SAR
- Clade: Alveolata
- Phylum: Myzozoa
- Superclass: Dinoflagellata
- Class: Syndiniophyceae
- Order: Coccidiniales
- Family: Euduboscquellaceae
- Genus: Euduboscquella; Coats, et al.

Genus of single-celled organisms

Euduboscquella (juˌduːboʊˈskwɛlə) is a genus of early branching dinoflagellates found in coastal waters around the globe. The members of this genus are all intracellular parasites that primarily infect Tintinnids. Euduboscquella are commonly found in marine environments, either infecting a host or in a resting stage in search of a new host, but there are a few freshwater and terrestrial species. Euduboscquella possess a multi-grooved shield separating their cytoplasm from the host’s cytoplasm, which is used by researchers to taxonomically identify them. The genus Euduboscquella contains nine species.

== Description ==
Many species of Euduboscquella parasitize various members of the Tintinnids, which are bell-shaped ciliates. It is not certain if different species of Euduboscquella have preference for or reliance on a particular species of tintinnids as this is poorly studied. They are also parasites of other organisms such as other dinoflagellates. Euduboscquella enter their host by being phagocytized by the host cell, but subsequently resist digestion. Euduboscquella spend most of their life cycle within their host’s cytoplasm, where they grow and mature. Once mature, Euduboscquella exits the host cell and begins to ingest their host. Depending on the species of Euduboscquella, they may phagocytize part of or the entire host cell. Eudubosquella infection usually kills the host. After digestion of their host Euduboscquella produces flagellated spores, which release from their host and search for new Tintinnid hosts. Euduboscquella species can produce either macrospores or microspores and some produce both, but only one type per infected host. Formation of a zygote by gametic spores and the presence of meiosis have also been reported.

During sporogenesis Eudobosquella produces characteristic “chains” of spores. Species of Euduboscquella have two to four different flagellated spore types: mono-flagellated spores, bi-flagellated spores, spherical spores without flagella, and cystic spores without flagella, which are either oval or spindle shaped. Cystic spores are the most common spore type, especially near the end of their seasonal cycle. The lengths of these spores range from 2 micrometers to 20.5 micrometers, where mono-flagellated spores tend to be the shortest type and bi-flagellated tend to be the longest type. Euduboscquella lack chloroplasts, as they acquire nutrition exclusively through phagocytosis of their host’s cytoplasmic contents. Some species of Euduboscquella form a peduncle, which is used to suck nutrients from their host. Later stages of Euduboscquella possess a multi-grooved shield which separates the host’s cytoplasm from Euduboscquella’s episome. The grooves cut across the shield in different directions and differ in number in the various species of Eudubscquella. The groove formations can occur as parallel, sagittal, crisscrossing, or curving out from the center of the shield, and can have as few as six and as many as 40 grooves. These grooves are key to differentiate between the various species of Euduboscquella.

For most species an individual distinct nucleus is located near the center of the Euduboscquella’s cell, but some instead have many nuclei located near the surface of the cell.

== Habitat and ecology ==
Euduboscquella are a cosmopolitan species and can be found in the coastal waters of nearly every continent except Antarctica and Australia. Euduboscquella population densities seem to be highest during summer months when conditions allow for larger host population sizes. The impacts of parasitic Euduboscquella on host populations of Tintinnids found in nature is not fully understood, but lab experiments showed that Euduboscquella remove a significant portion of the host’s biomass and would likely control population growth in Tintinnid populations found in a natural setting.

== History ==
The original genus Duboscquella that Euduboscquella species were placed into was discovered in 1920 by a French scientist, E. Chatton. Almost a century later, however, after studying the species E. Crenulata, D. W. Coats noticed characteristics that warranted a new genus, Eudubosquella to be made, where he placed E. Crenulata and 6 other Eudubosquella species in 2012.

== Species ==
The genus Euduboscquella and family Euduboscquellaceae were both described in 2012 by D. W. Coats, T. R. Bachvaroff and C. F. Delwiche, and contain 9 known species: E. anisospora, E. aspida, E. cachonii, E. caryophaga, E. costata, E. cnemata, E. crenulata E. melo, and E. nucleocola. The type species for this genus is E. crenulata first described in 2012. The number of species and the validity of the species included within Euduboscquella varies from author to author, where some authors state that only 7 or 8 species belong there.

== Etymology ==
The genus name Euduboscquella comes from a combination of the Greek word eu meaning “well” or “normal” and the old name for the genus, Duboscquella. Dubo comes from a combination of the Latin European word for “dive” and scquella, which comes from the Latin European name escuela meaning “castle” or “new home”, referring to their hollow house-like form.
