= Mesokaryote =

Hypothetical primitive eukaryotes

A mesokaryote or mesokaryotic organism is a single-celled eukaryote that shows intermediate resemblance to both prokaryotes and 'higher' eukaryotes. The term originates from a 1965 hypothesis by John David Dodge, who proposed that certain eukaryotes (mainly dinoflagellates) with closed mitosis and other traits considered 'primitive' were an intermediate step between prokaryotes and the remaining eukaryotes. This idea originated in the late 20th century, and was later disproven by more detailed ultrastructural studies in the following decades.

== History ==
The first investigations of the dinoflagellate nucleus, during the 1950s-1960s, revealed a fine nucleus and chromosome structure that was completely different from other nucleated organisms or eukaryotes, lacking histones and with a permanently condensed chromatin. Based on these findings, the phycologist John David Dodge proposed in 1965 the concept of Mesocaryota (or mesokaryotes) under the hypothesis that these features were an intermediate nuclear organization between prokaryotes and eukaryotes. This hypothesis led to the theory that dinoflagellates were the first to evolve from the split with prokaryotes, followed by the remaining eukaryotes. The traits considered by Dodge to define Mesocaryota were: lack of detectable histones; absence of a mitotic spindle; continuous DNA synthesis; chromatin fibrils arranged in arched swirls as in bacterial nucleoids; and chromosomes permanently condensed persistently adhered to the nuclear envelope, which remains intact throughout mitosis (i.e., it is a closed mitosis).

The mesokaryote hypothesis was disproven in the following decades through more detailed observations of the criteria listed above. For example, detailed studies on the parasitic Syndinium demonstrated the presence of an unconventional type of basic histone-like proteins and of an extranuclear mitotic spindle in dinoflagellates, similarly to 'higher' eukaryotes. Dinoflagellates remained considered a group of ancient but true eukaryotes. With the improvement of molecular phylogenetics, dinoflagellates, like other groups that exhibited closed mitosis, were instead revealed to be derived, branching within the Alveolata, whose members have conventional nuclei. Thus, these traits were reinterpreted as highly derived. Due to its short lifespan, the mesokaryote hypothesis has had little impact.
