= Apodinium =

Scientific classification
- Domain: Eukaryota
- Clade: Diaphoretickes
- Clade: SAR
- Clade: Alveolata
- Phylum: Myzozoa
- Superclass: Dinoflagellata
- Class: Dinophyceae
- Order: Blastodiniales
- Family: Apodiniaceae
- Genus: Apodinium; Chatton

Genus of protists

Apodinium is a genus of dinoflagellates belonging to the family Apodiniaceae.

Species:

- Apodinium chaetoceratis Paulsen
- Apodinium chattonii (Cachon) Cachon & Cachon-Enjumet
- Apodinium floodii N.McLean & C.P.Galt
- Apodinium mycetoides Chatton C
- Apodinium rhizophorum Chatton
- Apodinium zygorhizum Cachon & Cachon-Enjumet
