= Syndiniales =

Scientific classification
- Domain: Eukaryota
- Clade: Sar
- Superphylum: Alveolata
- Phylum: Dinoflagellata
- Class: Syndiniophyceae
- Order: Syndiniales; Loeblich III, 1976

Families
- Amoebophryaceae; Coccidiniaceae; Euduboscquellidae; Hematodiniidae; Sphaeriparaceae; Syndiniaceae

Synonyms
- Coccidinales Chatton & Biecheler 1934

Order of single-celled organisms

The Syndiniales are an order of early branching dinoflagellates (also known as Marine Alveolates, "MALVs"), found as parasites of crustaceans, fish, algae, cnidarians, and protists (ciliates, radiolarians, other dinoflagellates). The trophic form is often multinucleate, and ultimately divides to form motile spores, which have two flagella in typical dinoflagellate arrangement. They lack a theca and chloroplasts, and unlike all other orders, the nucleus is never a dinokaryon. A well-studied example is Amoebophrya, which is a parasite of other dinoflagellates and may play a part in ending red tides. Several MALV groups have been assigned to Syndiniales; recent studies, however, show paraphyly of MALVs suggesting that only those groups that branch as sister to dinokaryotes ('core dinoflagellates') belong to Syndiniales.

== Taxonomy ==
- Class Syndiniophyceae Loeblich III, 1976 [Syndinea]
  - Order Syndiniales Loeblich III 1976 [Coccidinales Chatton & Biecheler 1934]
    - Family Hematodiniidae
      - Genus Hematodinium Chatton & Poisson 1930
    - Family Coccidiniaceae [Coccidinidae Chatton & Biecheler 1934]
      - Genus Coccidinium Chatton & Biecheler 1934
    - Family Euduboscquellidae Coats, Bachvaroff & Delwiche 2012
      - Genus Euduboscquella Coats, Bachvaroff & Delwiche 2012
    - Family Syndiniaceae Chatton 1920
      - Genus Trypanodinium Chatton 1912
      - Genus Merodinium Chatton 1923
      - Genus Syndinium Chatton 1910 [Atelodinium Chatton 1920; Synhemidinium Chatton 1952 nom. illeg.; Solenodinium (Chatton 1923) Chatton 1952]
    - Family Amoebophryaceae Cachon 1964 ex Loeblich III 1970 [Amoebophryidae]
      - Genus Amoebophrya Koeppen 1894 [Hyalosaccus Koeppen 1899]
    - Family Sphaeriparaceae Loeblich III 1970
      - Genus Actinodinium Chatton & Hovasse 1937
      - Genus Caryotoma Hollande 1953
      - Genus Atlanticellodinium Cachon & Cachon-Enjumet 1965
      - Genus Sphaeripara Poche 1911 [Lohmannia Neresheimer 1903 non Michael 1898; Lohmanella Neresheimer 1904 non Trouessart 1901; Neresheimeria Übel 1912]

== See also ==
- Duboscquella
