= Eleutheroschisis =

Term in cell biology

Eleutheroschisis is asexual reproduction in dinoflagellates in which the parent organism completely sheds its theca (i.e. undergoes ecdysis) either before or immediately following cell division. Neither daughter cell inherits part of the parent theca. In terms of asexual division of motile cells, desmoschisis is generally the case in gonyaulaceans whereas eleutheroschisis is generally the case in peridinialeans.
