= Actiniscus pentasterias =

Scientific classification
- Domain: Eukaryota
- Clade: Diaphoretickes
- Clade: SAR
- Clade: Alveolata
- Phylum: Myzozoa
- Superclass: Dinoflagellata
- Class: Dinophyceae
- Order: Gymnodiniales
- Family: Actiniscaceae
- Genus: Actiniscus
- Species: A. pentasterias

Binomial name
- Actiniscus pentasterias (Ehrenberg) Ehrenberg

Species of single-celled organism

Actiniscus pentasterias is a species of dinoflagellate belonging to the family Actiniscaceae.

Synonym:

- Dictyocha pentasterias Ehrenberg (= basionym)
