= Desmoschisis =

Desmoschisis is asexual reproduction in dinoflagellates which the parent cell divides to produce two daughter cells, each of which retains half the parent theca, at least temporarily. During desmoschisis, the theca undergoes fission along a predetermined suture between thecal plates. The fission suture is oblique, usually from the top left to the bottom right (as in oblique binary fission). In terms of asexual division of motile cells, desmoschisis is generally the case in gonyaulacaleans, whereas eleutheroschisis is generally the case in peridinialeans.
