= Pentasters =

Dinoflagellates with an internal skeleton

A small number of dinoflagellates contain an internal skeleton. One of the best known species is perhaps Actiniscus pentasterias, in which each cell contains a pair of siliceous five-armed stars surrounding the nucleus. This species was originally described by Ehrenberg. Although the description is incomplete and without illustrations, Ehrenberg described the skeletal elements but mentioned that the living cell was colorless and non-motile. Ehrenberg subsequently diagrammed the silicified skeletal elements (pentasters) from geological deposits in various parts of the world. These can be found as microfossils. Pentasters were studied from the Cenozoic South Pacific by Dumitrică http://deepseadrilling.org/21/volume/dsdp21_25.pdf Tappan gave a survey of dinoflagellates with internal skeletons. This included the first detailed description of the pentasters in Actiniscus pentasterias, based on scanning electron microscopy.

The ultrastructure of Actiniscus pentasterias was investigated.
