= Dinoflagellate viral nucleoprotein =

Identifiers
- Symbol: DUF5756
- Pfam: PF19060
Available protein structures:
- Pfam: structures / ECOD
- PDB: RCSB PDB; PDBe; PDBj
- PDBsum: structure summary

Dinoflagellate/viral nucleoproteins (DVNPs) are a family of positively-charged, DNA-binding nucleoproteins found exclusively in dinoflagellates and Nucleocytoviricota. It serves to compact DNA in these organisms.

The proteins are known to pack DNA more tightly than histones do. When expressed in eukaryotes that possess histones, they displace nucleosomes and impair translation. This action is thought to be one of the driving forces for dinoflagellates to switch to this protein instead of histone for packaging. Some dinoflagellates have further switched to dinoflagellate histone-like proteins (HLPs) for packaging.

The version of DVNPs in dinoflagellates have a variable N-terminal tail with a nuclear localization signal. It also has many phosphorylation sites, a feature not seen in viral counterparts. The fixed C-terminal domain may have a helix-turn-helix fold.
