= Hypnozygote =

A hypnozygote is a resting cyst resulting from sexual fusion; it is commonly thick-walled. A synonym of zygotic cyst. Hypnozygotes have the ability to remain dormant in mud and other sediments until conditions become more favorable for growth.
