= Amoebophrya =

Scientific classification
- Domain: Eukaryota
- Clade: Sar
- Clade: Alveolata
- Division: Dinoflagellata
- Class: Syndiniophyceae
- Order: Syndiniales
- Family: Amoebophryaceae; J.Cachon ex A.R.Loeblich III
- Genus: Amoebophrya; Koeppen

Genus of single-celled organisms

Amoebophrya is a genus of dinoflagellates. Members of the Amoebophrya genus are syndinian parasites that infect free-living dinoflagellates and have varying degrees of host specificity The parasites might act as "biological control agents for red tides and aid in defining species of Amoebophrya." Researchers have found a correlation between host specify and the impact host parasites may have on other organisms. Due to the host specificity found in each strain of Amoebophrya's physical makeup, further studies need to be tested to determine whether the Amoebophrya can act as a control against harmful algal blooms.

== Amoebophrya strains ==
Different strains of Amoebophrya have been seen to infect different host species. Though research regarding the specificity of Amoebophrya is currently underway, the current hypothesis supported is that they range from non-host-specific to extremely host specific. Over twenty dinoflagellate species have been reported to be infected by some strain of Amoebophrya. It has proven to be difficult to determine whether or not a strain truly is host specific. Host specificity is confirmed not only through the strain's ability to infect various hosts, but their reproductive ability afterwards. If the Amoebophrya strain infects various hosts but is unable to successfully create following generations, then it would be considered host specific. Amoebophyra is mostly known for its correlation with harmful algal blooms (HABs). Abundance of certain strains have been linked to the decline of some HABs in marine life, while others have been found to cause it.

The ability of Amoebophrya to significantly reduce the population of HAB-forming dinoflagellates through predation is an essential aspect of its natural history and its contribution to marine ecosystems.

The following "strains" apply an open nomenclature format, where "sp." means "(a yet-to-be-named) species" and "ex" means "as found in (a certain host)".

- Amoebophrya sp. ex Karlodinium veneficum
- Amoebophrya sp. ex Prorocentrum minimum
- Amoebophrya sp. ex Dinophysis norvengica
- Amoebophrya sp. ex Gonyaulax polygramma
- Amoebophrya sp. ex Akashiwo sanguinea
- Amoebophrya sp. ex Dinophysis norvegica
- Amoebophrya sp. ex Alexandrium affine
- Amoebophrya sp. ex Ceratium tripos
- Amoebophrya sp. ex Prorocentrum micans
- Amoebophrya sp. ex Ceratium lineatum
- Amoebophrya sp. ex Scrippsiella sp.
- Amoebophrya sp. ex Ceratium tripos

Some proper species have been named as well, for example Amoebophrya cerati.

== Infection process ==
During its lifespan, Amoebophrya alternates between a free-swimming asexual reproductive stage called the dinospore, and a multinuclear growth phase within the host called the trophont stage. A dinospore will attach to the host (biology) cell's outer surface, then enter the cytosol. Most infections proceed within the nucleus, though some are confined to the cytoplasm. Within ten minutes, the parasite arrives at the host's nuclear envelope and significantly increases in size during the next twenty-four hours. Hosts infected by certain strains of Amoebophrya such as Amoebophrya ceratii are unable to reproduce before the parasite completes its life cycle and kills the host. It will continue to increase in size through nuclear divisions without the need for cytokinesis, resulting in a beehive-like appearance within the host. After killing the host, Amoebophrya grows to become mobile and wormlike, but soon separates into dinospores. These new dinospores then have a short period of time in which to find new hosts, as their survival time in water is meager. The aquatic environment can greatly affect the success of Amoebophrya, as a nutrient environment can influence its reproductive ability as well as its offspring's infectivity.
