= Duboscquella =

Scientific classification
- Domain: Eukaryota
- (unranked): SAR
- (unranked): Alveolata
- Phylum: Dinoflagellata
- Class: Incertae sedis
- Genus: Duboscquella

Genus of single-celled organisms

Duboscquella is a genus of dinoflagellates.

It was named in reference to Octave Duboscq (1868–1943), who was a French zoologist, mycologist and parasitologist.

The genus was circumscribed by Édouard (Pierre Léon) Chatton in Arch. Zool. Exp. Gen. Vol.59 on pages 322-325 in 1920.
