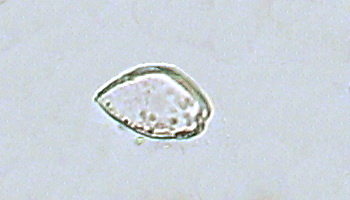
- Prorocentrum micans

Scientific classification
- Domain: Eukaryota
- Clade: Sar
- Clade: Alveolata
- Division: Dinoflagellata
- Class: Dinophyceae
- Order: Prorocentrales; Lemmermann

Families
- Haplodiniaceae Lindemann; Prorocentraceae F.Stein

= Prorocentrales =

Order of single-celled organisms

The Prorocentrales are a small order of dinoflagellates. They are distinguished by having their two flagella inserted apically, rather than ventrally as in other groups. One flagellum extends forward and the other circles its base, and there are no flagellar grooves. This arrangement is called desmokont, in contrast to the dinokont arrangement found in other groups. Accordingly, the Prorocentrales may be called desmoflagellates, and in some classifications were treated as a separate class Desmophyceae.

All members have chloroplasts and a theca, which is composed of two large plates joined by a sagittal suture. This structure is shared with the Dinophysiales, and they are probably sister groups. This does not show up on rRNA trees, which also show two separate groups of Prorocentrum, but they leave their relationships mostly unresolved.
