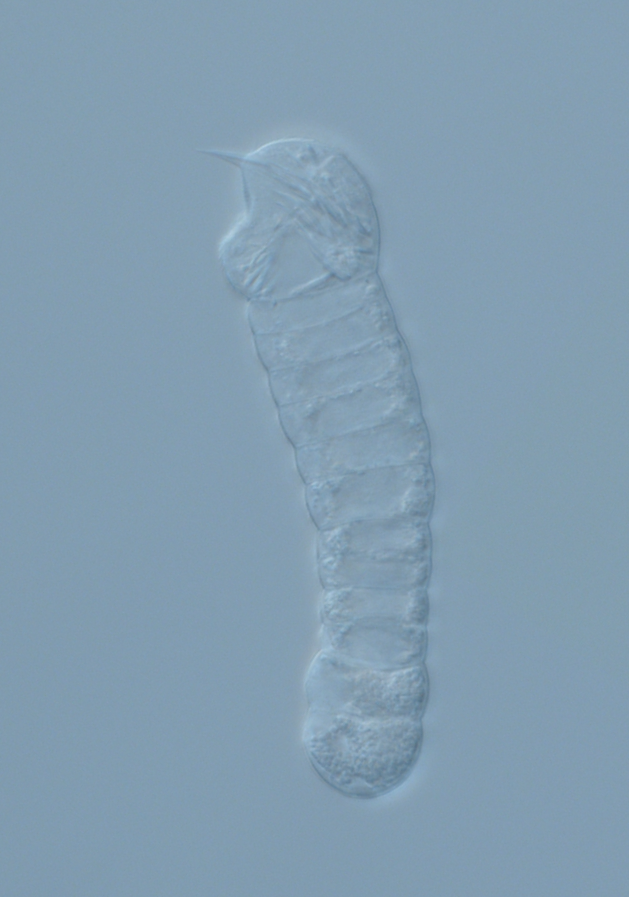
- Light micrograph of Haplozoon axiothellae in its trophont stage

Scientific classification
- Domain: Eukaryota
- Supergroup: Alveolata
- Division: Dinoflagellata
- Class: Dinophyceae
- Order: Blastodiniales; Chatton

= Blastodiniales =

Order of dinoflagellates

Blastodiniales is an order of dinoflagellates belonging to the class Dinophyceae.

Families:

- Apodinidae
- Blastodinidae
- Diplomorphidae
- Haplozoonidae
- Oodiniaceae
- Oodinidae
- Paradinophycidae
