= Dinokaryon =

Type of nucleus seen in many dinoflagellates

A dinokaryon is a eukaryotic nucleus present in dinoflagellates in which the chromosomes are fibrillar in appearance (i.e. with unmasked DNA fibrils) and are more or less continuously condensed.

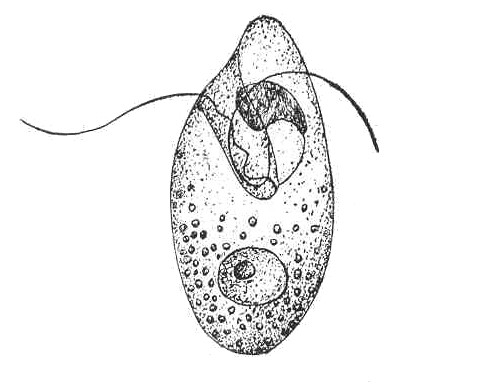
Nucleus with a dark nucleolus. The cell usually measures between 20 and 30 micrometers.

The nuclear envelope does not break down during mitosis, which is thus termed closed mitosis, or "dinomitosis". The mitotic spindle is extranuclear.

Histones are absent. However, recent EST sequencing has revealed the presence of histones in one of the closest relative to dinoflagellates, Perkinsus marinus and an early-branching dinoflagellate, Hematodinium sp. However, histone-like proteins of bacterial origins are found in the coding regions at periphery of the dinokaryon's chromosomes.
