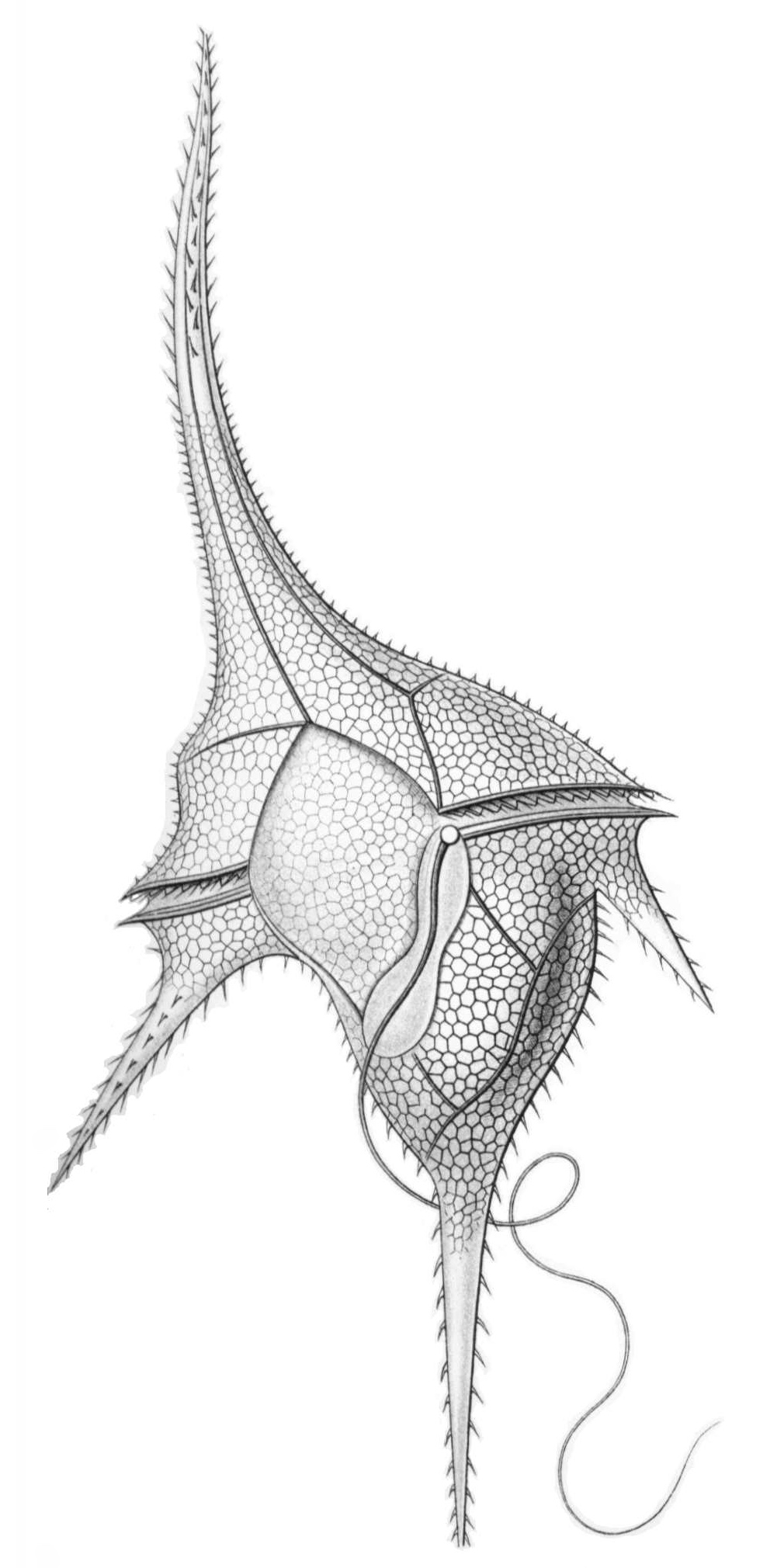
- Ceratium sp.

Scientific classification
- Domain: Eukaryota
- Supergroup: Alveolata
- Clade: Dinozoa
- Division: Dinoflagellata; Bütschli 1885

Classes
- Ellobiophyceae; Psammosea; Oxyrrhea; Pronoctilucea; Duboscquellea; Syndiniophyceae; Noctiluciphyceae; Dinophyceae

Synonyms
- Cilioflagellata Claparède & Lachmann 1868; Arthrodelen Flagellaten Stein 1883; Dinophyceae Bütschli 1885 sensu Pascher 1914; Pyrrophyta Pascher 1914; Pyrrhophycophyta Papenfuss 1946; Dinophyta Dillon 1963; Dinomastigota Margulis & Sagan 1985

= Dinoflagellate =

Dinoflagellate Temporal range: 240–0 Ma Triassic or earlier–Present

Aquatic, unicellular protists with two flagella

The dinoflagellates (from Ancient Greek δῖνος (dînos) 'whirling' and Latin flagellum 'whip, scourge'), also called dinophytes, are a monophyletic group of single-celled eukaryotes constituting the phylum Dinoflagellata and are usually considered protists. Dinoflagellates are mostly marine plankton, but they are also common in freshwater habitats. Populations vary with sea surface temperature, salinity, and depth. Many dinoflagellates are photosynthetic, but a large fraction of these are in fact mixotrophic, combining photosynthesis with ingestion of prey (phagotrophy and myzocytosis).

In terms of number of species, dinoflagellates are one of the largest groups of marine eukaryotes, although substantially smaller than diatoms. Some species are endosymbionts of marine animals and play an important part in the biology of coral reefs. Other dinoflagellates are unpigmented predators on other protozoa, and a few forms are parasitic (for example, Oodinium and Pfiesteria). Some dinoflagellates produce resting stages, called dinoflagellate cysts or dinocysts, as part of their lifecycles; this occurs in 84 of the 350 described freshwater species and a little more than 10% of the known marine species. Dinoflagellates are alveolates possessing two flagella, the ancestral condition of bikonts.

About 1,555 species of free-living marine dinoflagellates are currently described. Another estimate suggests about 2,000 living species, of which more than 1,700 are marine (free-living, as well as benthic) and about 220 are from fresh water. The latest estimates suggest a total of 2,294 living dinoflagellate species, which includes marine, freshwater, and parasitic dinoflagellates.

A rapid accumulation of certain dinoflagellates can result in a visible coloration of the water, colloquially known as red tide (a harmful algal bloom), which can cause shellfish poisoning if humans eat contaminated shellfish. Some dinoflagellates also exhibit bioluminescence, primarily emitting blue-green light, which may be visible in oceanic areas under certain conditions.

== Etymology ==
The term "dinoflagellate" is a combination of the Greek dinos and the Latin flagellum. Dinos means "whirling" and signifies the distinctive way in which dinoflagellates were observed to swim. Flagellum means "whip" and this refers to their flagella.

== History ==
In 1753, the first modern dinoflagellates (Noctiluca, although not formally named until 1816) were described by Henry Baker as "Animalcules which cause the Sparkling Light in Sea Water". Otto Friedrich Müller recorded Bursaria (now Ceratium) hirundinella and Vorticella (now Peridinium) cinctum in 1773.

The oldest generic name for a Dinoflagellate is Ceratium, which was proposed by Schrank (1793).

In the 1830s, the German microscopist Christian Gottfried Ehrenberg examined many water and plankton samples and proposed several dinoflagellate genera that are still used today including Peridinium, Prorocentrum, and Dinophysis.

These same dinoflagellates were first defined by Otto Bütschli in 1885 as the flagellate order Dinoflagellida. Botanists treated them as a division of algae, named Pyrrophyta or Pyrrhophyta ("fire algae"; Greek pyrr(h)os, fire) after the bioluminescent forms, or Dinophyta. At various times, the cryptomonads, ebriids, and ellobiopsids have been included here, but only the last are now considered close relatives. Dinoflagellates have a known ability to transform from noncyst to cyst-forming strategies, which makes recreating their evolutionary history extremely difficult.

== Morphology ==
Representation of a dinoflagellate: 1. Plastid membranes (3, secondary red); 2. Thylakoids, site of the light-dependent reactions of photosynthesis; 3. Pyrenoid, center of carbon fixation; 4. Trichocyst; 5. Alveolus, surface cavity or pit; 6. Thecal plate; 7. Sac pusule; 8. Vacuome; 9. Golgi apparatus; modifies proteins and sends them out of the cell; 10. Endoplasmic reticulum, the transport network for molecules going to specific parts of the cell; 11. Transverse flagellum; 12. Striated strand; 13. Collecting pusule; 14. Mitochondrion, creates ATP (energy) for the cell; 15. Nucleus; 16. Nucleolus; 17. Condensed chromosome; 18. Starch granule; 19. Lysosome, holds enzymes; 20. Phagosome, vesicle formed around a particle; 21. Mastigoneme, "hairs" that attached to flagellum; 22. Longitudinal flagellum

Dinoflagellates are unicellular and possess two dissimilar flagella arising from the ventral cell side (dinokont flagellation). They have a ribbon-like transverse flagellum with multiple waves that beats to the cell's left, and a more conventional one, the longitudinal flagellum, that beats posteriorly. The transverse flagellum is a wavy ribbon in which only the outer edge undulates from base to tip, due to the action of the axoneme which runs along it. The axonemal edge has simple hairs that can be of varying lengths. The flagellar movement produces forward propulsion and also a turning force. The longitudinal flagellum is relatively conventional in appearance, with few or no hairs. It beats with only one or two periods to its wave. The flagella lie in surface grooves: the transverse one in the cingulum and the longitudinal one in the sulcus, although its distal portion projects freely behind the cell. In dinoflagellate species with desmokont flagellation (e.g., Prorocentrum), the two flagella are differentiated as in dinokonts, but they are not associated with grooves.

Dinoflagellates have a complex cell covering called an amphiesma or cortex, composed of a series of membranes, flattened vesicles called alveoli (= amphiesmal vesicles) and related structures. In thecate ("armoured") dinoflagellates, these support overlapping cellulose plates to create a sort of armor called the theca or lorica, as opposed to athecate ("nude") dinoflagellates. These occur in various shapes and arrangements, depending on the species and sometimes on the stage of the dinoflagellate. Conventionally, the term tabulation has been used to refer to this arrangement of thecal plates. The plate configuration can be denoted with the plate formula or tabulation formula. Fibrous extrusomes are also found in many forms.

A transverse groove, the so-called cingulum (or cigulum) runs around the cell, thus dividing it into an anterior (episoma) and posterior (hyposoma). If and only if a theca is present, the parts are called epitheca and hypotheca, respectively. Posteriorly, starting from the transverse groove, there is a longitudinal furrow called the sulcus. The transverse flagellum strikes in the cingulum, the longitudinal flagellum in the sulcus.

Together with various other structural and genetic details, this organization indicates a close relationship between the dinoflagellates, the Apicomplexa, and ciliates, collectively referred to as the alveolates.

Dinoflagellate tabulations can be grouped into six "tabulation types": gymnodinoid, suessoid, gonyaulacoid–peridinioid, nannoceratopsioid, dinophysioid, and prorocentroid.

Most Dinoflagellates have a plastid derived from secondary endosymbiosis of red algae, however dinoflagellates with plastids derived from green algae and tertiary endosymbiosis of diatoms have also been discovered. Similar to other photosynthetic organisms, dinoflagellates contain chlorophylls a and c2 and the carotenoid beta-carotene. Dinoflagellates also produce the xanthophylls including peridinin, dinoxanthin, and diadinoxanthin. These pigments give many dinoflagellates their typical golden brown color. However, the dinoflagellates Karenia brevis, Karenia mikimotoi, and Karlodinium micrum have acquired other pigments through endosymbiosis, including fucoxanthin. This suggests their chloroplasts were incorporated by several endosymbiotic events involving already colored or secondarily colorless forms. The discovery of plastids in the Apicomplexa has led some to suggest they were inherited from an ancestor common to the two groups, but none of the more basal lines has them. All the same, the dinoflagellate cell consists of the more common organelles such as rough and smooth endoplasmic reticulum, Golgi apparatus, mitochondria, lipid and starch grains, and food vacuoles. Some have even been found with a light-sensitive organelle, the eyespot or stigma, or a larger nucleus containing a prominent nucleolus. The dinoflagellate Erythropsidinium has the smallest known eye.

Some athecate species have an internal skeleton consisting of two star-like siliceous elements that has an unknown function, and can be found as microfossils. Tappan gave a survey of dinoflagellates with internal skeletons. This included the first detailed description of the pentasters in Actiniscus pentasterias, based on scanning electron microscopy. They are placed within the order Gymnodiniales, suborder Actiniscineae.

=== Theca structure and formation ===
The formation of thecal plates has been studied in detail through ultrastructural studies.

=== The dinoflagellate nucleus: dinokaryon ===
'Core dinoflagellates' (dinokaryotes) have a peculiar form of nucleus, called a dinokaryon, in which the chromosomes are attached to the nuclear membrane. These carry reduced number of histones. In place of histones, dinoflagellate nuclei contain a novel, dominant family of nuclear proteins that appear to be of viral origin, thus are called Dinoflagellate viral nucleoproteins (DVNPs) which are highly basic, bind DNA with similar affinity to histones, and occur in multiple posttranslationally modified forms. Dinoflagellate nuclei remain condensed throughout interphase rather than just during mitosis, which is closed and involves a uniquely extranuclear mitotic spindle. This sort of nucleus was once considered to be an intermediate between the nucleoid region of prokaryotes and the true nuclei of eukaryotes, so were termed "mesokaryotic," but now are considered derived rather than primitive traits (i. e. ancestors of dinoflagellates had typical eukaryotic nuclei). In addition to dinokaryotes, DVNPs can be found in a group of basal dinoflagellates (known as Marine Alveolates, "MALVs") that branch as sister to dinokaryotes (Syndiniales).

== Classification ==
=== Generality ===
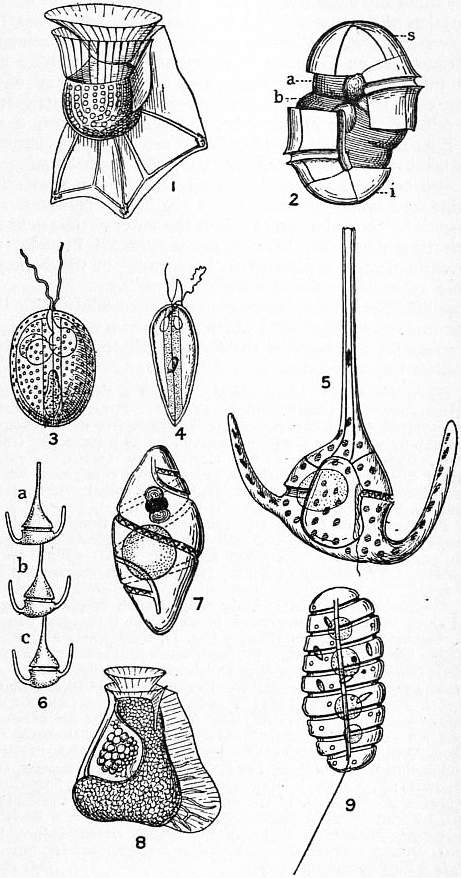
1. Ornithocercus; 2. diagram; 3. Exuviaella; 4. Prorocentrum; 5, 6. Ceratium; 7. Warnowia; 8. Citharistes; 9. Polykrikos

Dinoflagellates are protists and have been classified using both the International Code of Botanical Nomenclature (ICBN, now renamed as ICN) and the International Code of Zoological Nomenclature (ICZN). About half of living dinoflagellate species are autotrophs possessing chloroplasts and half are nonphotosynthesising heterotrophs.

The peridinin dinoflagellates, named after their peridinin plastids, appear to be ancestral for the dinoflagellate lineage. Almost half of all known species have chloroplasts, which are either the original peridinin plastids or new plastids acquired from other lineages of unicellular algae through endosymbiosis. The remaining species have lost their photosynthetic abilities and have adapted to a heterotrophic, parasitic or kleptoplastic lifestyle.

Most (but not all) dinoflagellates have a dinokaryon, described below (see: Life cycle, below). Dinoflagellates with a dinokaryon are classified under Dinokaryota, while dinoflagellates without a dinokaryon are classified under Syndiniales.

Although classified as eukaryotes, the dinoflagellate nuclei are not characteristically eukaryotic, as some of them lack histones and nucleosomes, and maintain continually condensed chromosomes during mitosis. The dinoflagellate nucleus was termed 'mesokaryotic' by Dodge (1966), due to its possession of intermediate characteristics between the coiled DNA areas of prokaryotic bacteria and the well-defined eukaryotic nucleus. This group, however, does contain typically eukaryotic organelles, such as Golgi bodies, mitochondria, and chloroplasts.

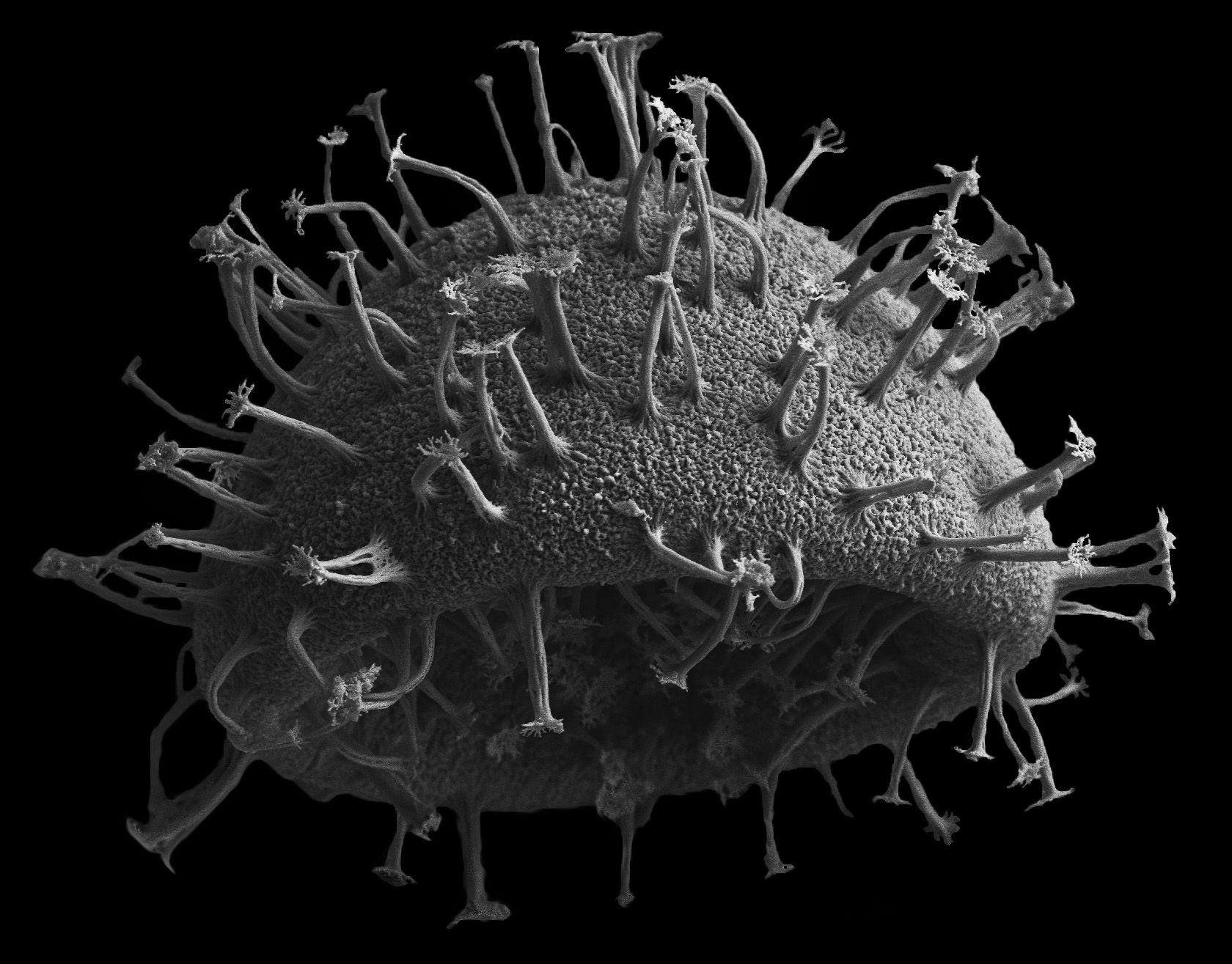
Dinophytic microalga isolated from sediments of Amur Bay

Jakob Schiller (1931–1937) provided a description of all the species, both marine and freshwater, known at that time. Later, Alain Sournia (1973, 1978, 1982, 1990, 1993) listed the new taxonomic entries published after Schiller (1931–1937). Sournia (1986) gave descriptions and illustrations of the marine genera of dinoflagellates, excluding information at the species level. The latest index is written by Gómez.

=== Identification ===
English-language taxonomic monographs covering large numbers of species are published for the Gulf of Mexico, the Indian Ocean, the British Isles, the Mediterranean and the North Sea.

The main source for identification of freshwater dinoflagellates is the Süsswasser Flora.

Calcofluor-white can be used to stain thecal plates in armoured dinoflagellates.

== Ecology and physiology ==
=== Habitats ===
Dinoflagellates are found in all aquatic environments: marine, brackish, and fresh water, including in snow or ice. They are also common in benthic environments and sea ice.

=== Endosymbionts ===
All Zooxanthellae are dinoflagellates and most of them are members within Symbiodiniaceae (e.g., the genus Symbiodinium). The association between Symbiodinium and reef-building corals is widely known. However, endosymbiontic Zooxanthellae inhabit a great number of other invertebrates and protists, for example many sea anemones, jellyfish, nudibranchs, the giant clam Tridacna, and several species of radiolarians and foraminiferans. Many extant dinoflagellates are parasites (here defined as organisms that eat their prey from the inside, i.e. endoparasites, or that remain attached to their prey for longer periods of time, i.e. ectoparasites). They can parasitize animal or protist hosts. Protoodinium, Crepidoodinium, Piscinoodinium, and Blastodinium retain their plastids while feeding on their zooplanktonic or fish hosts. In most parasitic dinoflagellates, the infective stage resembles a typical motile dinoflagellate cell.

=== Nutritional strategies ===
Three nutritional strategies are seen in dinoflagellates: phototrophy, mixotrophy, and heterotrophy. Phototrophs can be photoautotrophs or auxotrophs. Mixotrophic dinoflagellates are photosynthetically active, but are also heterotrophic. Facultative mixotrophs, in which autotrophy or heterotrophy is sufficient for nutrition, are classified as amphitrophic. If both forms are required, the organisms are mixotrophic sensu stricto. Some free-living dinoflagellates do not have chloroplasts, but host a phototrophic endosymbiont. A few dinoflagellates may use alien chloroplasts (cleptochloroplasts), obtained from food (kleptoplasty). Some dinoflagellates may feed on other organisms as predators or parasites.

Food inclusions contain bacteria, bluegreen algae, diatoms, ciliates, and other dinoflagellates.

Mechanisms of capture and ingestion in dinoflagellates are quite diverse. Several dinoflagellates, both thecate (e.g. Ceratium hirundinella, Peridinium globulus) and nonthecate (e.g. Oxyrrhis marina, Gymnodinium sp. and Kofoidinium spp.), draw prey to the sulcal region of the cell (either via water currents set up by the flagella or via pseudopodial extensions) and ingest the prey through the sulcus. In several Protoperidinium spp., e.g. P. conicum, a large feeding veil—a pseudopod called the pallium—is extruded to capture prey which is subsequently digested extracellularly (= pallium-feeding). Oblea, Zygabikodinium, and Diplopsalis are the only other dinoflagellate genera known to use this particular feeding mechanism. Gymnodinium fungiforme, commonly found as a contaminant in algal or ciliate cultures, feeds by attaching to its prey and ingesting prey cytoplasm through an extensible peduncle. Two related genera, Polykrikos and Neatodinium, shoot out a harpoon-like organelle to capture prey.

Some mixotrophic dinoflagellates are able to produce neurotoxins that have anti-grazing effects on larger copepods and enhance the ability of the dinoflagellate to prey upon larger copepods. Toxic strains of Karlodinium veneficum produce karlotoxin that kills predators who ingest them, thus reducing predatory populations and allowing blooms of both toxic and non-toxic strains of K. veneficum. Further, the production of karlotoxin enhances the predatory ability of K. veneficum by immobilizing its larger prey. K. armiger are more inclined to prey upon copepods by releasing a potent neurotoxin that immobilizes its prey upon contact. When K. armiger are present in large enough quantities, they are able to cull whole populations of their copepod prey.

The feeding mechanisms of the oceanic dinoflagellates remain unknown, although pseudopodial extensions were observed in Podolampas bipes.

=== Pigments in dinoflagellates ===
Dinoflagellates possess a distinctive suite of photosynthetic pigments that allow them to survive and grow in a variety of aquatic environments. Like other phytoplankton, many dinoflagellates contain chlorophyll a and chlorophyll c, which are essential for photosynthesis and light energy capture. However, unlike green algae and higher plants, they lack chlorophyll b. Instead, they utilize chlorophyll c2, which is more efficient for absorbing blue-green light, making them well adapted to low-light or deeper water conditions. These pigments, along with carotenoids, contribute to the characteristic coloration of dinoflagellates, which can range from golden-brown to red.

A unique pigment in dinoflagellates is peridinin, a specialized carotenoid that plays a key role in light harvesting and energy transfer to chlorophyll a. Peridinin is highly efficient in capturing blue light, which penetrates deeper into the water column, giving many dinoflagellates a competitive advantage in stratified or turbid environments. Additionally, dinoflagellates contain other carotenoids such as diadinoxanthin and dinoxanthin, which play important roles in photoprotection by dissipating excess light energy and preventing oxidative stress under high irradiance. These pigments are necessary for photoacclimation, allowing dinoflagellates to survive under fluctuating light conditions.

Not all dinoflagellates rely solely on photosynthetic pigments for energy. Many species are heterotrophic or mixotrophic, meaning they can acquire nutrients through both photosynthesis and predation. Symbiotic dinoflagellates, such as Symbiodinium, play an important ecological role by forming mutualistic relationships with corals, where their pigments drive photosynthesis and energy production that sustain coral reef ecosystems. The unique pigment composition of dinoflagellates also contributes to large-scale phenomena such as harmful algal blooms and red tides, where high concentrations of pigmented cells cause dramatic discoloration of coastal waters and can produce toxic effects.

=== Blooms ===
==== Introduction ====
Dinoflagellate blooms are generally unpredictable, short, with low species diversity, and with little species succession. The low species diversity can be due to multiple factors. One way a lack of diversity may occur in a bloom is through a reduction in predation and a decreased competition. The first may be achieved by having predators reject the dinoflagellate, by, for example, decreasing the amount of food it can eat. This additionally helps prevent a future increase in predation pressure by causing predators that reject it to lack the energy to breed. A species can then inhibit the growth of its competitors, thus achieving dominance.

==== Harmful algal blooms ====
Dinoflagellates sometimes bloom in concentrations of more than a million cells per millilitre. Under such circumstances, they can produce toxins (generally called dinotoxins) in quantities capable of killing fish and accumulating in filter feeders such as shellfish, which in turn may be passed on to people who eat them. This phenomenon is called a red tide, from the color the bloom imparts to the water. Some colorless dinoflagellates may also form toxic blooms, such as Pfiesteria. Some dinoflagellate blooms are not dangerous. Bluish flickers visible in ocean water at night often come from blooms of bioluminescent dinoflagellates, which emit short flashes of light when disturbed.

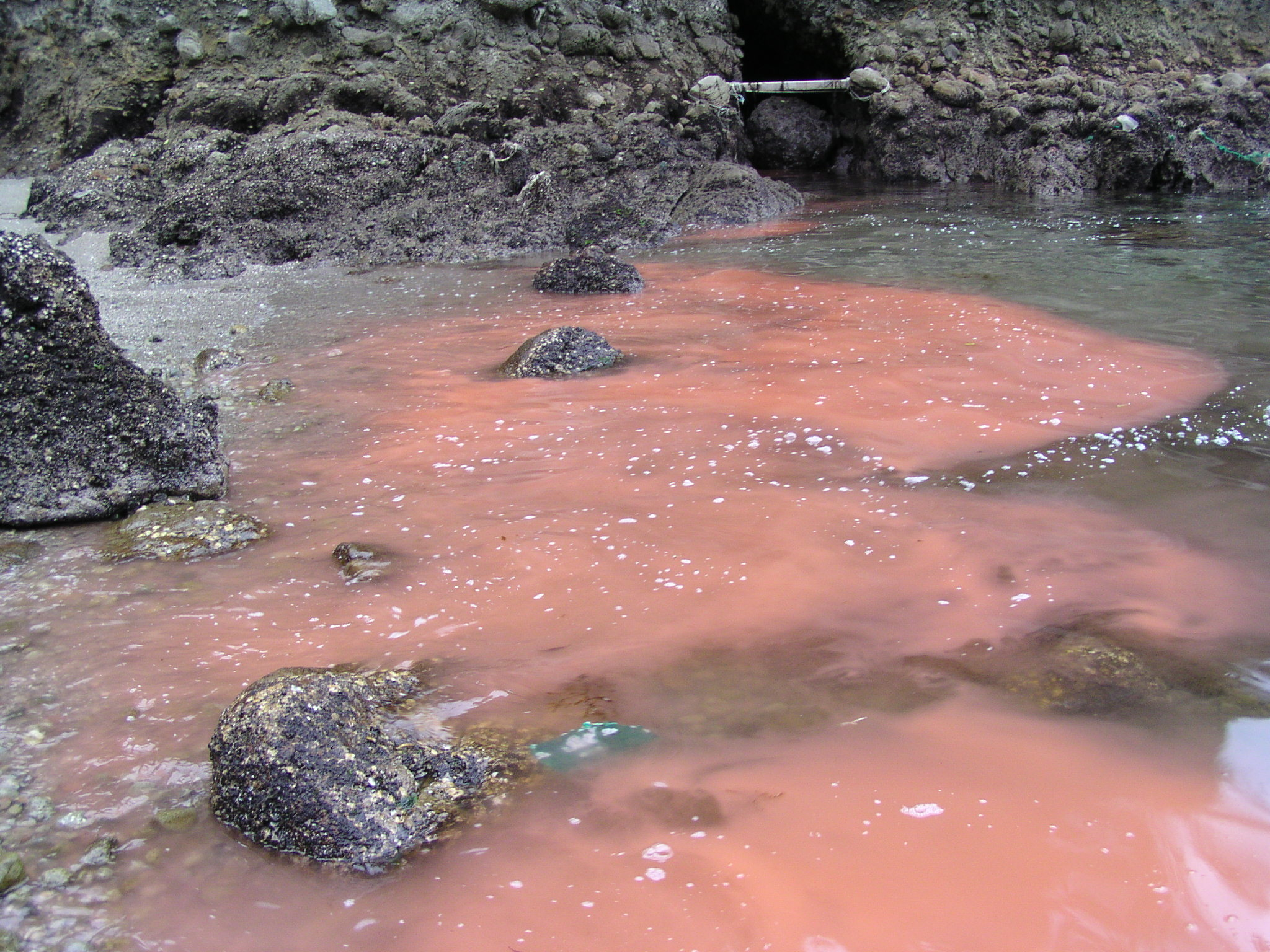
Algal bloom (akasio) by Noctiluca spp. in Nagasaki

A red tide occurs because dinoflagellates are able to reproduce rapidly and copiously as a result of the abundant nutrients in the water. They contain toxins that affect surrounding marine life and people who consume them. A specific carrier is shellfish, which can introduce both nonfatal and fatal illnesses. One such poison is saxitoxin, a powerful paralytic neurotoxin.

Human inputs of phosphate further encourage these red tides, so strong interest exists in learning more about dinoflagellates, from both medical and economic perspectives. Dinoflagellates are known to be particularly capable of scavenging dissolved organic phosphorus for P-nutrient, several HAS species have been found to be highly versatile and mechanistically diversified in utilizing different types of DOPs. The ecology of harmful algal blooms is extensively studied.

=== Bioluminescence ===
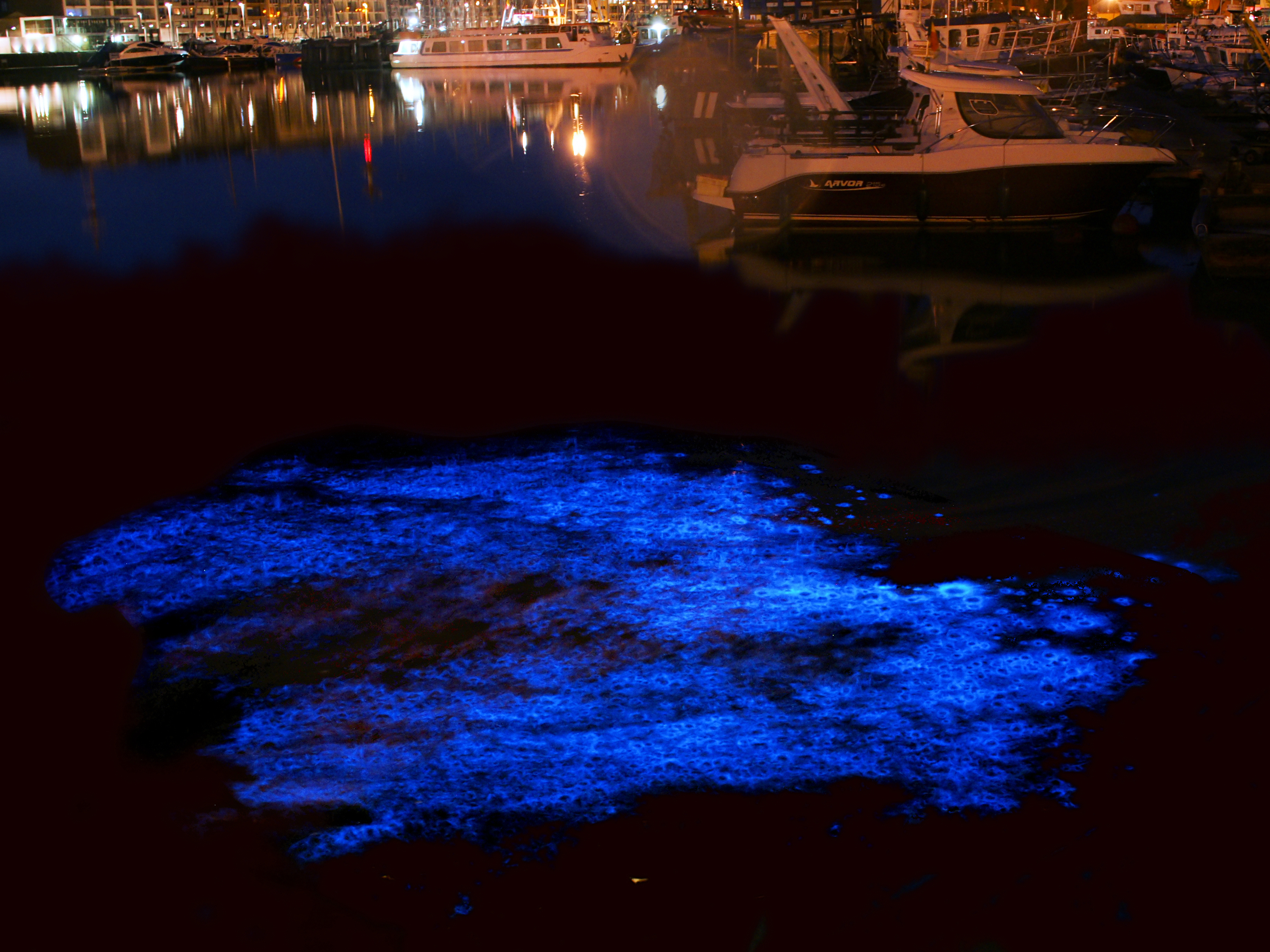
Long exposure image of bioluminescence of N. scintillans in the yacht port of Zeebrugge, Belgium

Kayaking in the Bioluminescent Bay, Vieques, Puerto Rico

At night, water can have an appearance of sparkling light due to the bioluminescence of dinoflagellates. More than 18 genera of dinoflagellates are bioluminescent, and the majority of them emit a blue-green light. These species contain scintillons, individual cytoplasmic bodies (about 0.5 μm in diameter) distributed mainly in the cortical region of the cell, outpockets of the main cell vacuole. They contain dinoflagellate luciferase, the main enzyme involved in dinoflagellate bioluminescence, and luciferin, a chlorophyll-derived tetrapyrrole ring that acts as the substrate to the light-producing reaction. The luminescence occurs as a brief (0.1 sec) blue flash (max 476 nm) when stimulated, usually by mechanical disturbance. Therefore, when mechanically stimulated—by boat, swimming, or waves, for example—a blue sparkling light can be seen emanating from the sea surface.

Dinoflagellate bioluminescence is controlled by a circadian clock and only occurs at night. Luminescent and nonluminescent strains can occur in the same species. The number of scintillons is higher during night than during day, and breaks down during the end of the night, at the time of maximal bioluminescence.

The luciferin-luciferase reaction responsible for the bioluminescence is pH sensitive. When the pH drops, luciferase changes its shape, allowing luciferin, more specifically tetrapyrrole, to bind. This occurs from a mechanical disturbance that induces an action potential in the cell membrane. Some species also possess the luciferin binding protein which binds to luciferin before acidification to protect it from autoxidation, and then releases it upon the structural change to make luciferin active.

The "oxygen defense hypothesis" suggests that bioluminescence first evolved in response to the Great Oxidation Event when oxygen accumulated in the atmosphere. Organisms had to adapt to oxidative stress from reactive oxygen species, resulting in light emission as a byproduct. Although bioluminescence originated as an environmental adaptation, ecological interaction has changed its role.

Dinoflagellates can use bioluminescence as a defense mechanism. They can startle their predators by their flashing light, use it as an aposematic signal to warn of toxicity, or ward off potential predators by an indirect effect such as the "burglar alarm". In the "burglar alarm" hypothesis, bioluminescence attracts attention to the dinoflagellate and its attacker, making the predator more vulnerable to predation from higher trophic levels. Although this is the most accepted hypothesis, but there is a different possible mechanism that is focused on the behavior of the grazer. Copepods were found to have increased jump frequency when bioluminescence was present, which increased their detectability to higher order predators. This suggests that the copepod behavior is what causes the "burglar alarm" effect as opposed to the bioluminescence by itself. All of these hypotheses indicate that bioluminescence is advantageous for survival which is why it is a conserved trait among dinoflagellates.

Bioluminescent dinoflagellate ecosystem bays are among the rarest and most fragile, with the most famous ones being the Bioluminescent Bay in La Parguera, Lajas, Puerto Rico; Mosquito Bay in Vieques, Puerto Rico; and Las Cabezas de San Juan Reserva Natural Fajardo, Puerto Rico. Also, a bioluminescent lagoon is near Montego Bay, Jamaica, and bioluminescent harbors surround Castine, Maine. Within the United States, Central Florida is home to the Indian River Lagoon which is abundant with dinoflagellates in the summer and bioluminescent ctenophore in the winter.

=== Lipid and sterol production ===
Dinoflagellates produce characteristic lipids and sterols. One of these sterols is typical of dinoflagellates and is called dinosterol.

=== Transport ===
Dinoflagellate theca can sink rapidly to the seafloor in marine snow.

== Life cycle ==
=== Introduction ===
Dinoflagellates have a haplontic life cycle, with the possible exception of Noctiluca and its relatives. The life cycle usually involves asexual reproduction by means of mitosis, either through desmoschisis or eleutheroschisis. More complex life cycles occur, more particularly with parasitic dinoflagellates. Sexual reproduction also occurs, though this mode of reproduction is only known in a small percentage of dinoflagellates. This takes place by fusion of two individuals to form a zygote, which may remain mobile in typical dinoflagellate fashion and is then called a planozygote. This zygote may later form a resting stage or hypnozygote, which is called a dinoflagellate cyst or dinocyst. After (or before) germination of the cyst, the hatchling undergoes meiosis to produce new haploid cells. Dinoflagellates appear to be capable of carrying out several DNA repair processes that can deal with different types of DNA damage.

Dinoflagellata life cycle: 1-mitosis, 2-sexual reproduction, 3-planozygote, 4-hypnozygote, 5-planomeiocyte

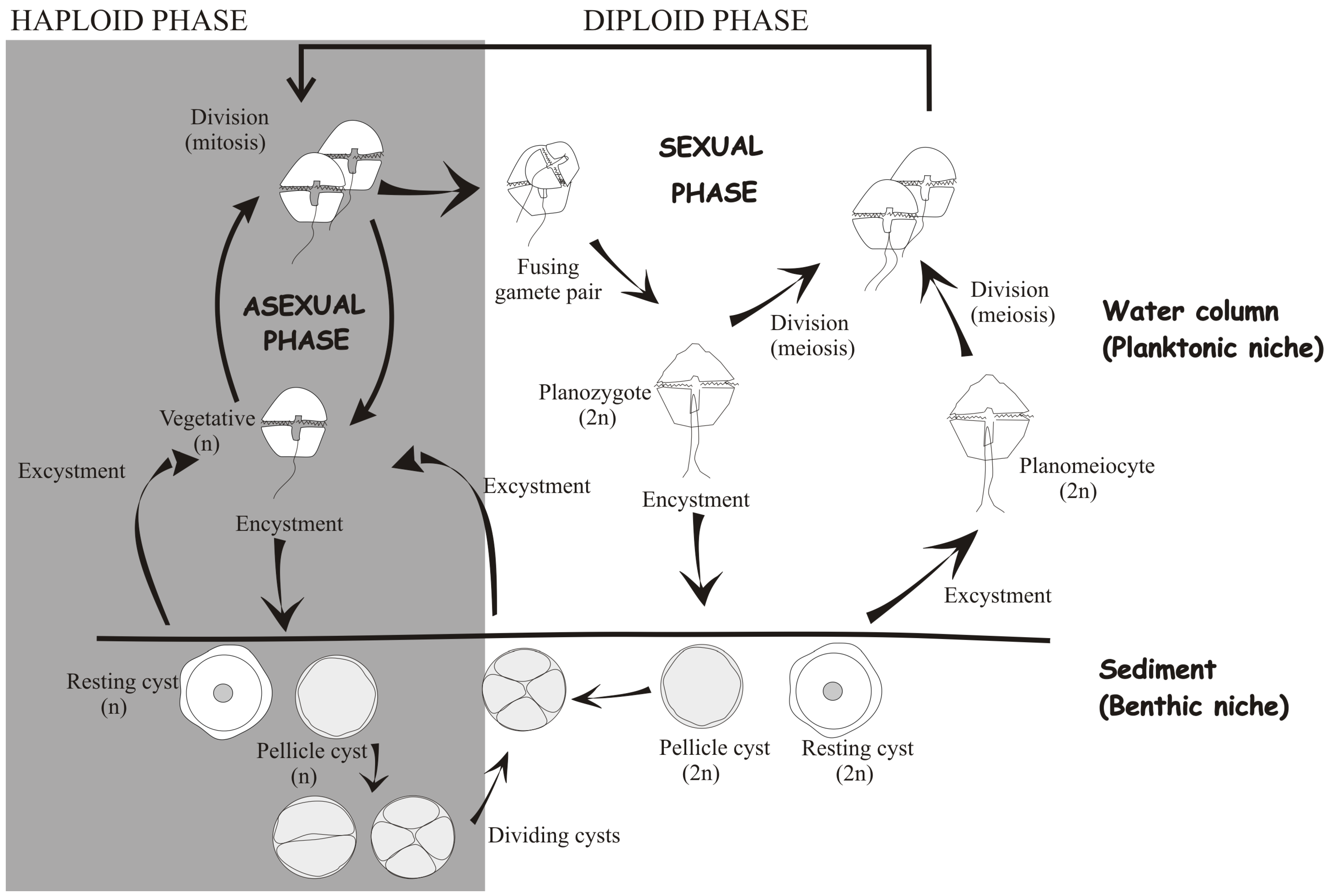
The life cycle of dinoflagellates, including possible described transitions

=== Dinoflagellate cysts ===
The life cycle of many dinoflagellates includes at least one nonflagellated benthic stage as a cyst. Different types of dinoflagellate cysts are mainly defined based on morphological (number and type of layers in the cell wall) and functional (long- or short-term endurance) differences. These characteristics were initially thought to clearly distinguish pellicle (thin-walled) cysts from resting (double-walled) dinoflagellate cysts. The former were considered short-term (temporal) and the latter long-term (resting) cysts. However, during the last two decades further knowledge has highlighted the great intricacy of dinoflagellate life histories.

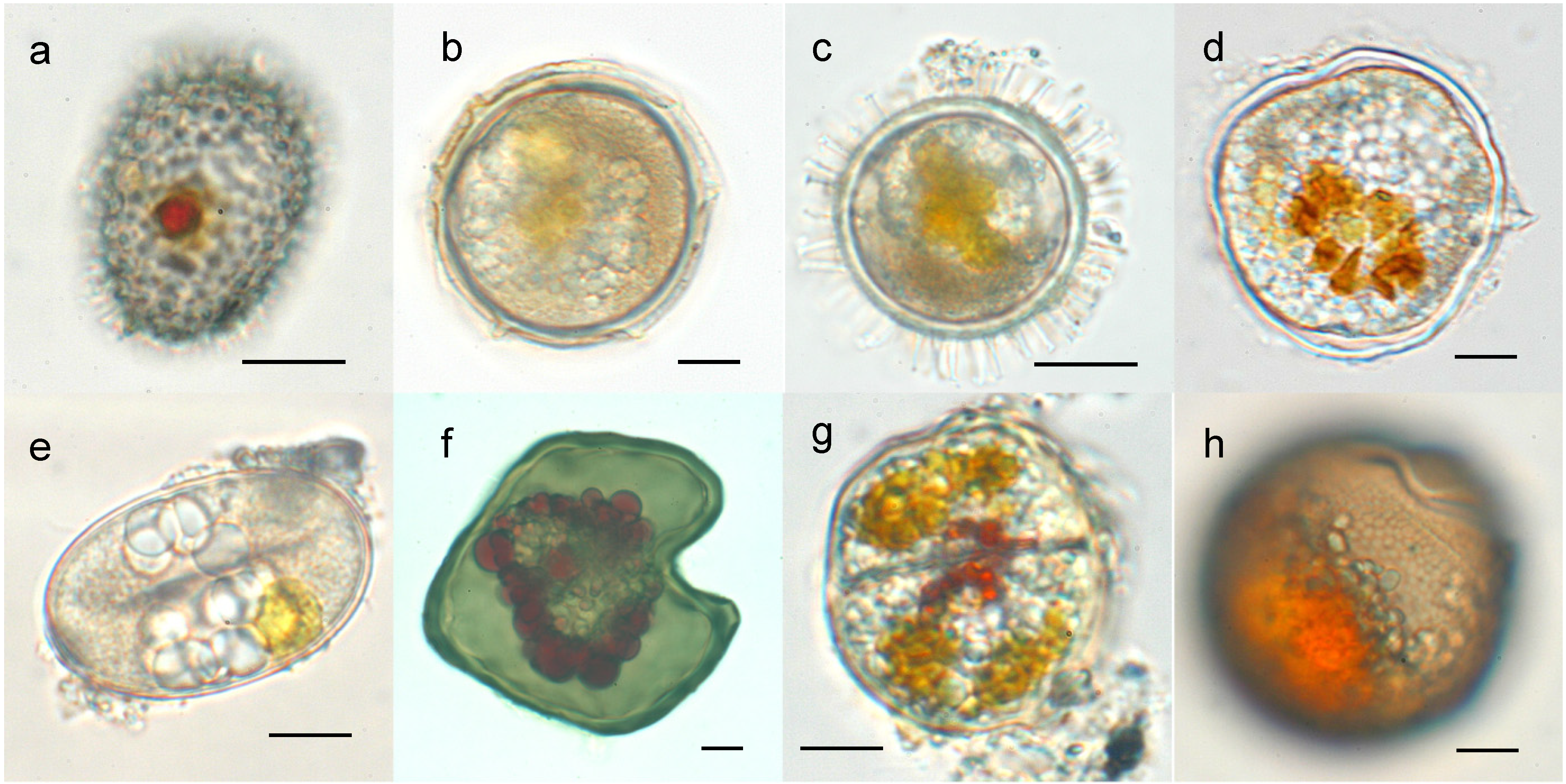
Resting cysts of Scripsiella sp. (a), Alexandrium pseudogoniaulax (b), Protoceratium reticulatum (c), A. taylori (d), A. tamarense (e), Protoperidinium oblongum (f), Kryptoperidinium triquetrum (g), and Gymnodinium catenatum (h). Scale bar: 10 μm.

More than 10% of the approximately 2000 known marine dinoflagellate species produce cysts as part of their life cycle (see diagram on the right). These benthic phases play an important role in the ecology of the species, as part of a planktonic-benthic link in which the cysts remain in the sediment layer during conditions unfavorable for vegetative growth and, from there, reinoculate the water column when favorable conditions are restored.

Indeed, during dinoflagellate evolution the need to adapt to fluctuating environments and/or to seasonality is thought to have driven the development of this life cycle stage. Most protists form dormant cysts in order to withstand starvation and UV damage. However, there are enormous differences in the main phenotypic, physiological and resistance properties of each dinoflagellate species cysts. Unlike in higher plants most of this variability, for example in dormancy periods, has not been proven yet to be attributed to latitude adaptation or to depend on other life cycle traits. Thus, despite recent advances in the understanding of the life histories of many dinoflagellate species, including the role of cyst stages, many gaps remain in knowledge about their origin and functionality.

Recognition of the capacity of dinoflagellates to encyst dates back to the early 20th century, in biostratigraphic studies of fossil dinoflagellate cysts. Paul Reinsch was the first to identify cysts as the fossilized remains of dinoflagellates. Later, cyst formation from gamete fusion was reported, which led to the conclusion that encystment is associated with sexual reproduction. These observations also gave credence to the idea that microalgal encystment is essentially a process whereby zygotes prepare themselves for a dormant period. Because the resting cysts studied until that time came from sexual processes, dormancy was associated with sexuality, a presumption that was maintained for many years. This attribution was coincident with evolutionary theories about the origin of eukaryotic cell fusion and sexuality, which postulated advantages for species with diploid resting stages, in their ability to withstand nutrient stress and mutational UV radiation through recombinational repair, and for those with haploid vegetative stages, as asexual division doubles the number of cells. Nonetheless, certain environmental conditions may limit the advantages of recombination and sexuality, such that in fungi, for example, complex combinations of haploid and diploid cycles have evolved that include asexual and sexual resting stages.

However, in the general life cycle of cyst-producing dinoflagellates as outlined in the 1960s and 1970s, resting cysts were assumed to be the fate of sexuality, which itself was regarded as a response to stress or unfavorable conditions. Sexuality involves the fusion of haploid gametes from motile planktonic vegetative stages to produce diploid planozygotes that eventually form cysts, or hypnozygotes, whose germination is subject to both endogenous and exogenous controls. Endogenously, a species-specific physiological maturation minimum period (dormancy) is mandatory before germination can occur. Thus, hypnozygotes were also referred to as "resting" or "resistant" cysts, in reference to this physiological trait and their capacity following dormancy to remain viable in the sediments for long periods of time. Exogenously, germination is only possible within a window of favorable environmental conditions.

Yet, with the discovery that planozygotes were also able to divide it became apparent that the complexity of dinoflagellate life cycles was greater than originally thought. Following corroboration of this behavior in several species, the capacity of dinoflagellate sexual phases to restore the vegetative phase, bypassing cyst formation, became well accepted. Further, in 2006 Kremp and Parrow showed the dormant resting cysts of the Baltic cold water dinoflagellates Scrippsiella hangoei and Gymnodinium sp. were formed by the direct encystment of haploid vegetative cells, i.e., asexually. In addition, for the zygotic cysts of Pfiesteria piscicida dormancy was not essential.

== Genomics ==
One of the most striking features of dinoflagellates is the large amount of cellular DNA that they contain. Most eukaryotic algae contain on average about 0.54 pg DNA/cell, whereas estimates of dinoflagellate DNA content range from 3–250 pg/cell, corresponding to roughly 3000–215 000 Mb (in comparison, the haploid human genome is 3180 Mb and hexaploid Triticum wheat is 16 000 Mb). Polyploidy or polyteny may account for this large cellular DNA content, but earlier studies of DNA reassociation kinetics and recent genome analyses do not support this hypothesis. Rather, this has been attributed, hypothetically, to the rampant retroposition found in dinoflagellate genomes.

In addition to their disproportionately large genomes, dinoflagellate nuclei are unique in their morphology, regulation, and composition. Their DNA is so tightly packed that exactly how many chromosomes they have is still uncertain.

The dinoflagellates share an unusual mitochondrial genome organisation with their relatives, the Apicomplexa. Both groups have very reduced mitochondrial genomes (around 6 kilobases (kb) in the Apicomplexa vs ~16kb for human mitochondria). One species, Amoebophrya ceratii, has lost its mitochondrial genome completely, yet still has functional mitochondria. The genes on the dinoflagellate genomes have undergone a number of reorganisations, including massive genome amplification and recombination which have resulted in multiple copies of each gene and gene fragments linked in numerous combinations. Loss of the standard stop codons, trans-splicing of mRNAs for the mRNA of cox3, and extensive RNA editing recoding of most genes has occurred. The reasons for this transformation are unknown. In a small group of dinoflagellates, called 'dinotoms' (Durinskia and Kryptoperidinium), the endosymbionts (diatoms) still have mitochondria, making them the only organisms with two evolutionarily distinct mitochondria.

In most of the species, the plastid genome consist of just 14 genes.

The DNA of the plastid in the peridinin-containing dinoflagellates is contained in a series of small circles called minicircles. Each circle contains one or two polypeptide genes. The genes for these polypeptides are chloroplast-specific because their homologs from other photosynthetic eukaryotes are exclusively encoded in the chloroplast genome. Within each circle is a distinguishable 'core' region. Genes are always in the same orientation with respect to this core region.

In terms of DNA barcoding, ITS sequences can be used to identify species, where a genetic distance of p≥0.04 can be used to delimit species, which has been successfully applied to resolve long-standing taxonomic confusion as in the case of resolving the Alexandrium tamarense complex into five species. A recent study revealed a substantial proportion of dinoflagellate genes encode for unknown functions, and that these genes could be conserved and lineage-specific.

== Evolutionary history ==
Dinoflagellates are mainly represented as fossils by dinocysts, which have a long geological record with lowest occurrences during the mid-Triassic, whilst geochemical markers suggest a presence to the Early Cambrian. Some evidence indicates dinosteroids in many Paleozoic and Precambrian rocks might be the product of ancestral dinoflagellates (protodinoflagellates). Dinoflagellates show a classic radiation of morphologies during the Late Triassic through the Middle Jurassic. More modern-looking forms proliferate during the later Jurassic and Cretaceous. This trend continues into the Cenozoic, albeit with some loss of diversity.

Molecular phylogenetics show that dinoflagellates are grouped with ciliates and apicomplexans (=Sporozoa) in a well-supported clade, the alveolates. The closest relatives to dinokaryotic dinoflagellates appear to be apicomplexans, Perkinsus, Parvilucifera, syndinians, and Oxyrrhis. Molecular phylogenies are similar to phylogenies based on morphology.

The earliest stages of dinoflagellate evolution appear to be dominated by parasitic lineages, such as perkinsids and syndinians (e.g. Amoebophrya and Hematodinium).

All dinoflagellates contain red algal plastids or remnant (nonphotosynthetic) organelles of red algal origin. The parasitic dinoflagellate Hematodinium however lacks a plastid entirely. Some groups that have lost the photosynthetic properties of their original red algae plastids has obtained new photosynthetic plastids (chloroplasts) through so-called serial endosymbiosis, both secondary and tertiary:

- Lepidodinium unusually possesses a green algae-derived plastid (all other serially acquired plastids can be traced back to red algae). The plastid is most related to free-living Pedinomonas (hence likely secondary). Two previously undescribed dinoflagellates ("MGD" and "TGD") contain a closely related plastid.
- Karenia, Karlodinium, and Takayama possess plastids of haptophyte origin, produced in three separate events.
- "Dinotoms" (Durinskia and Kryptoperidinium) have plastids derived from diatoms.

Some species also perform kleptoplasty:

- Dinophysis have plastids from a cryptomonad, due to kleptoplasty from a cilate prey.
- The Kareniaceae (which contains the three haptophyte-having genera) contains two separate cases of kleptoplasty.

Dinoflagellate evolution has been summarized into five principal organizational types: prorocentroid, dinophysoid, gonyaulacoid, peridinioid, and gymnodinoid. The transitions of marine species into fresh water have been frequent events during the diversification of dinoflagellates and have occurred recently.

Many dinoflagellates also have a symbiotic relationship with cyanobacteria, called cyanobionts, which have a reduced genome and has not been found outside their hosts. The Dinophysoid dinoflagellates have two genera, Amphisolenia and Triposolenia, that contain intracellular cyanobionts, and four genera; Citharistes, Histioneis, Parahistioneis, and Ornithocercus, that contain extracellular cyanobionts. Most of the cyanobionts are used for nitrogen fixation, not for photosynthesis, but some don't have the ability to fix nitrogen. The dinoflagellate Ornithocercus magnificus is host for symbionts which resides in an extracellular chamber. While it is not fully known how the dinoflagellate benefit from it, it has been suggested it is farming the cyanobacteria in specialized chambers and regularly digests some of them.

Recently, the living fossil Dapsilidinium pastielsii was found inhabiting the Indo-Pacific Warm Pool, which served as a refugium for thermophilic dinoflagellates, and others such as Calciodinellum operosum and Posoniella tricarinelloides were also described from fossils before later being found alive.

== Examples ==
- Alexandrium
- Gonyaulax
- Gymnodinium
- Lingulodinium polyedrum
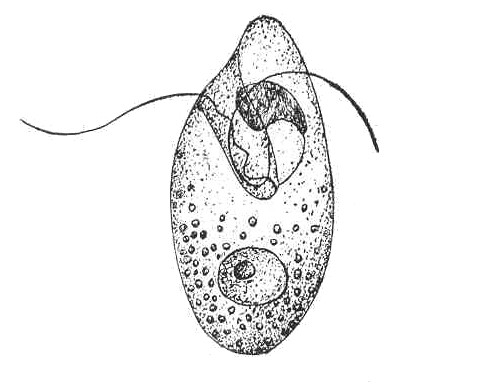
Oxyrrhis marina (Oxyrrhea)

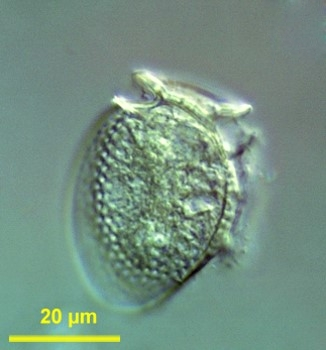
Dinophysis acuminata (Dinophyceae)

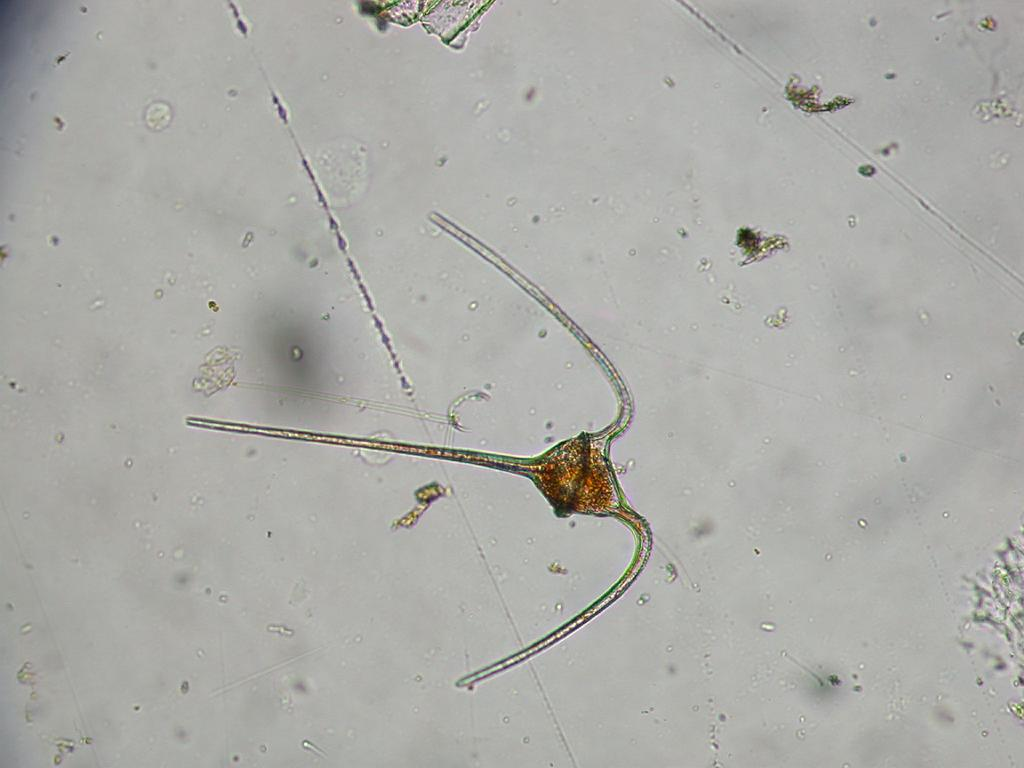
Ceratium macroceros (Dinophyceae)

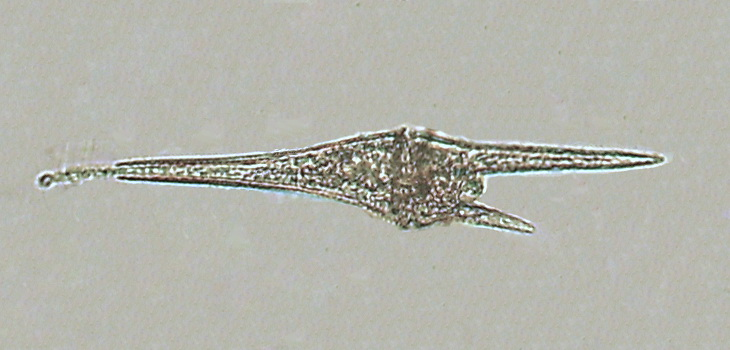
Ceratium furcoides (Dinophyceae)

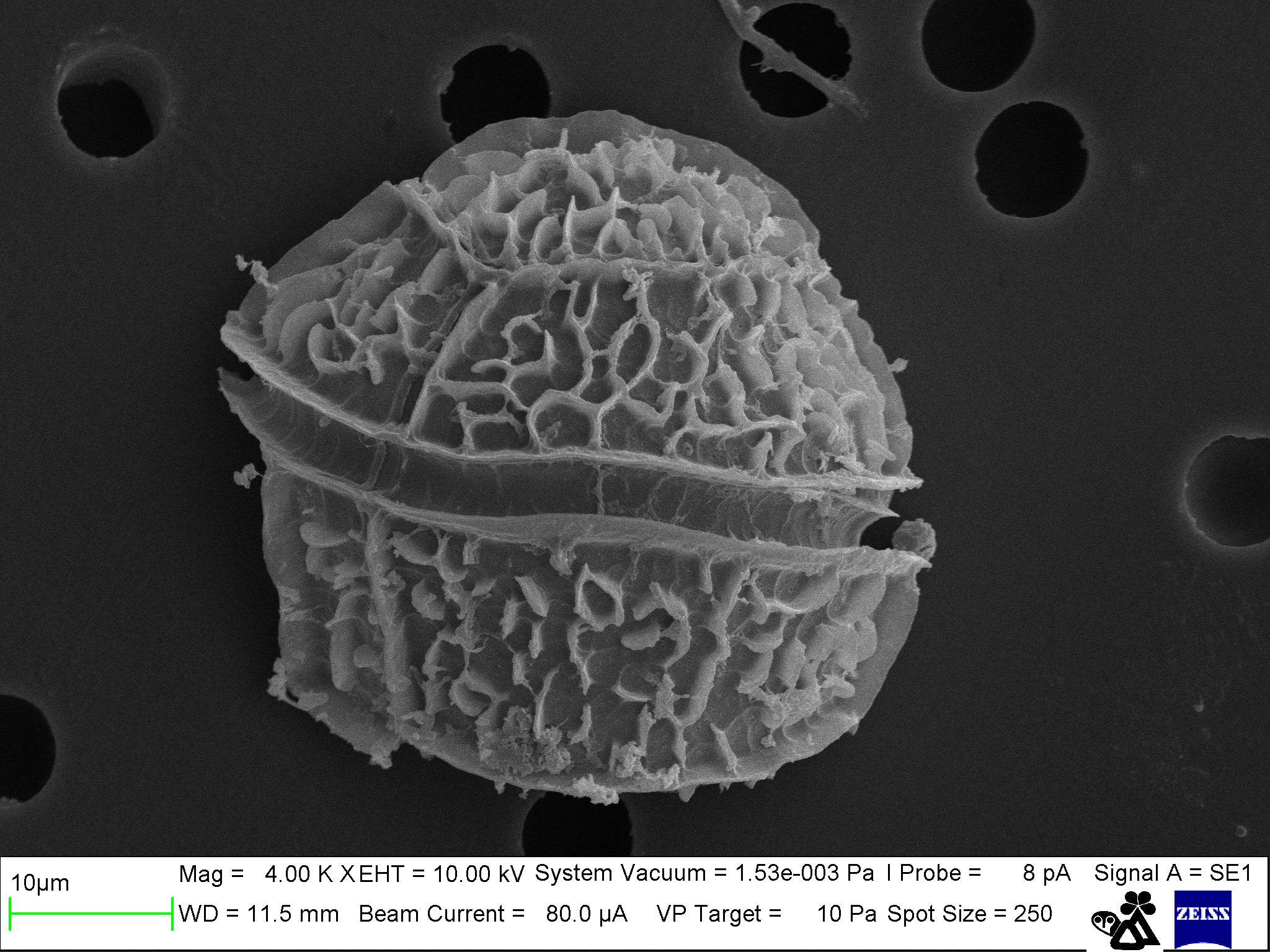
Unknown dinoflagellate under SEM (Dinophyceae)

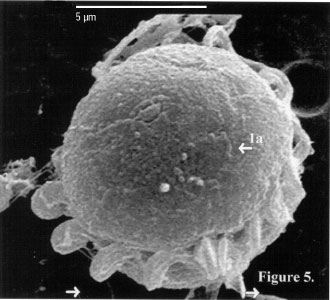
Pfiesteria shumwayae (Dinophyceae)

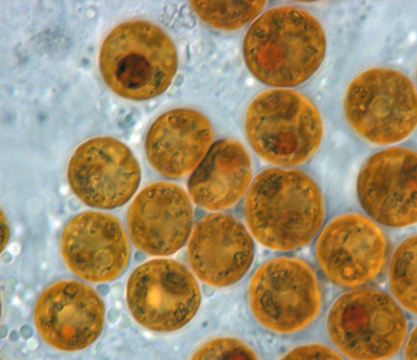
Symbiodinium sp. (Dinophyceae): zooxanthella, a coral endosymbiont

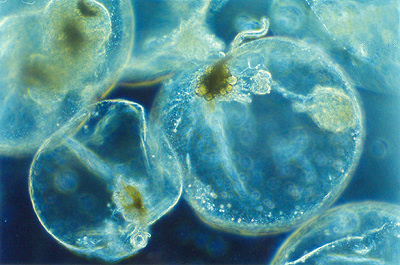
Noctiluca scintillans (Noctiluciphyceae)

== See also ==
- Ciguatera
- Paralytic shellfish poisoning
- Yessotoxin
- Thin layers (oceanography)

== Bibliography ==
- Spector D (1984). Dinoflagellates. Academic Press. ISBN 978-0-3231-3813-0. Archived from the original on 2014-07-07.
- Taylor F (1987). The Biology of Dinoflagellates. Botanical monographs. Vol. 21. Blackwell Scientific. ISBN 978-0-6320-0915-2.
