= Predatory dinoflagellate =

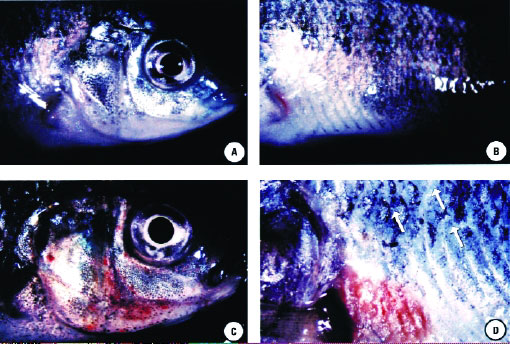
Acute pfiesteriosis in tilapia Top row: unaffected fish; bottom row: fish preyed upon by the carnivorous alga Pfiesteria shumwayae.

Predatory dinoflagellates are predatory heterotrophic or mixotrophic alveolates that derive some or most of their nutrients from digesting other organisms. About one half of dinoflagellates lack photosynthetic pigments and specialize in consuming other eukaryotic cells, and even photosynthetic forms are often predatory.

Organisms that derive their nutrition in this manner include Oxyrrhis marina, which feeds phagocytically on phytoplankton, Polykrikos kofoidii, which feeds on several species of red-tide and/or toxic dinoflagellates, Ceratium furca, which is primarily photosynthetic but also capable of ingesting other protists such as ciliates, Cochlodinium polykrikoides, which feeds on phytoplankton, Gambierdiscus toxicus, which feeds on algae and produces a toxin that causes ciguatera fish poisoning when ingested, and Pfiesteria and related species such as Luciella masanensis, which feed on diverse prey including fish skin and human blood cells. Predatory dinoflagellates can kill their prey by releasing toxins or phagocytize small prey directly.

Some predatory algae have evolved extreme survival strategies. For example, Oxyrrhis marina can turn cannibalistic on its own species when no suitable non-self prey is available, and Pfiesteria and related species have been discovered to kill and feed on fish, and since have been (mistakenly) referred to as carnivorous "algae" by the media.

== Pfiesteria hysteria ==
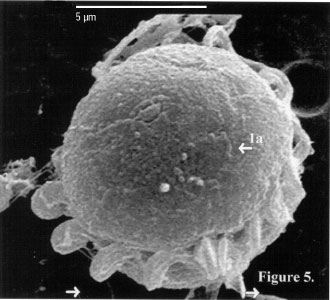
Pfiesteria shumwayae

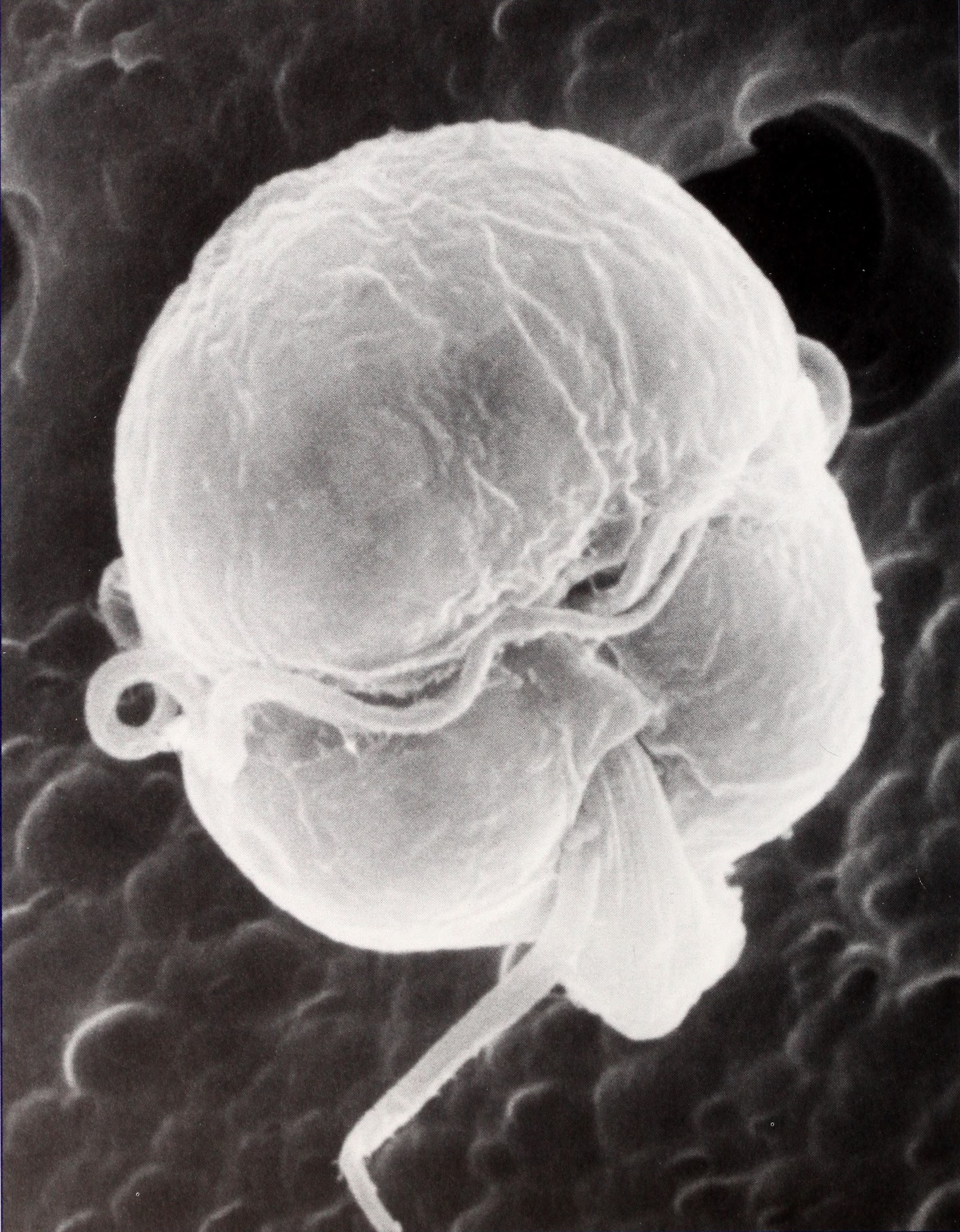
Pfiesteria piscicida

The media has applied the term carnivorous or predatory algae mainly to Pfiesteria piscicida, Pfiesteria shumwayae and other Pfiesteria-like dinoflagellates implicated in harmful algal blooms and fish kills. Pfiesteria is named after the American protistologist Lois Ann Pfiester. It is an ambush predator that utilizes a hit and run feeding strategy by releasing a toxin that paralyzes the respiratory systems of susceptible fish, such as menhaden, thus causing death by suffocation. It then consumes the tissue sloughed off its dead prey. Pfiesteria piscicida (Latin: fish killer) has been blamed for killing more than one billion fish in the Neuse and Pamlico river estuaries in North Carolina and causing skin lesions in humans in the 1990s. It has been described as "skinning fish alive to feed on their flesh" or chemically sensing fish and producing lethal toxins to kill their prey and feed off the decaying remains. Its deadly nature has led to Pfiesteria being referred to as "killer algae" and has earned the organism the reputation as the "T. rex of the dinoflagellate world" or "the Cell from Hell."

The prominent and exaggerating media coverage of Pfiesteria as carnivorous algae attacking fish and humans has been implicated in causing "Pfiesteria hysteria" in the Chesapeake Bay in 1997 resulting in an apparent outbreak of human illness in the Pocomoke region in Maryland. However, a study published the following year concluded the symptoms were unlikely to be caused by mass hysteria.

== In popular culture ==
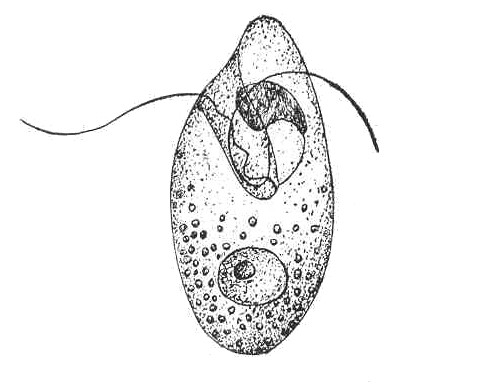
Oxyrrhis marina

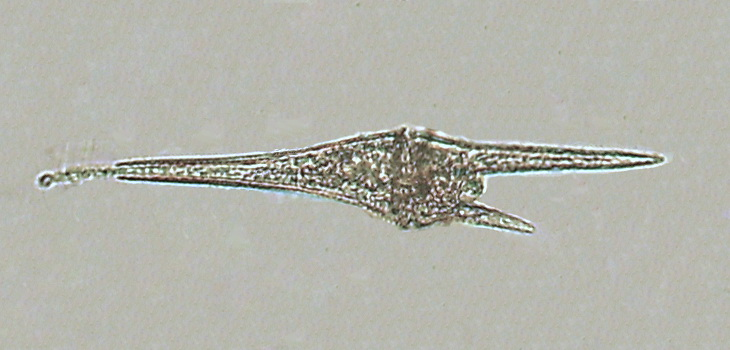
Ceratium furca

During the media coverage in the 1990s, Pfiesteria has been referred to as "super villain" and subsequently has been used as such in several fictional works. A Pfiesteria subspecies killing humans featured in James Powlik's 1999 environmental thriller Sea Change. In Frank Schätzing's 2004 science fiction novel The Swarm, lobsters and crabs spread the killer alga Pfiesteria homicida to humans.

In Yann Martel's 2001 novel Life of Pi, the protagonist encounters a floating island of carnivorous algae inhabited by meerkats while shipwrecked in the Pacific Ocean. At a book reading in Calgary, Alberta, Canada, Martel explained that the carnivorous algae island had the purpose of representing the more fantastical of two competing stories in his novel and challenge the reader to a "leap of faith."

In the 2005 National Geographic TV show Extraterrestrial, the alien organism termed Hysteria combines characteristics of Pfiesteria with those of cellular slime molds. Like Pfiesteria, Hysteria is a unicellular, microscopic predator capable of producing a paralytic toxin. Like cellular slime molds, it can release chemical stress signals that cause the cells to aggregate into a swarm which allows the newly formed superorganism to feed on much larger animals and produce a fruiting body that releases spores for reproduction.

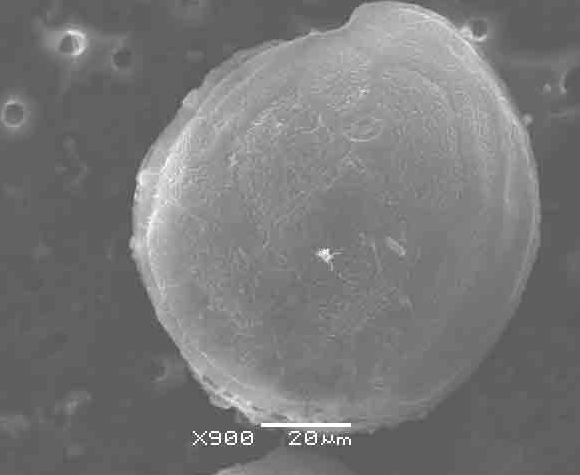
Gambierdiscus toxicus

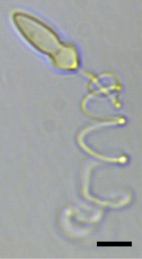
Polykrikos kofoidii

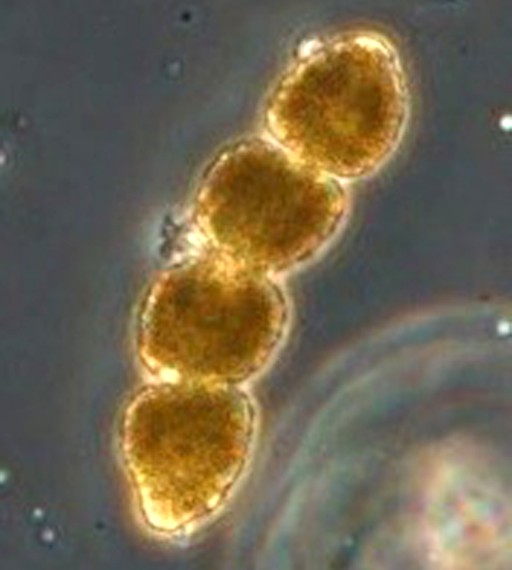
Cochlodinium polykrikoides

== See also ==
- Carnivorous fungus
- Carnivorous plant
- Protocarnivorous plant
