= Carnivore =

Organism that eats mostly or exclusively animal tissue

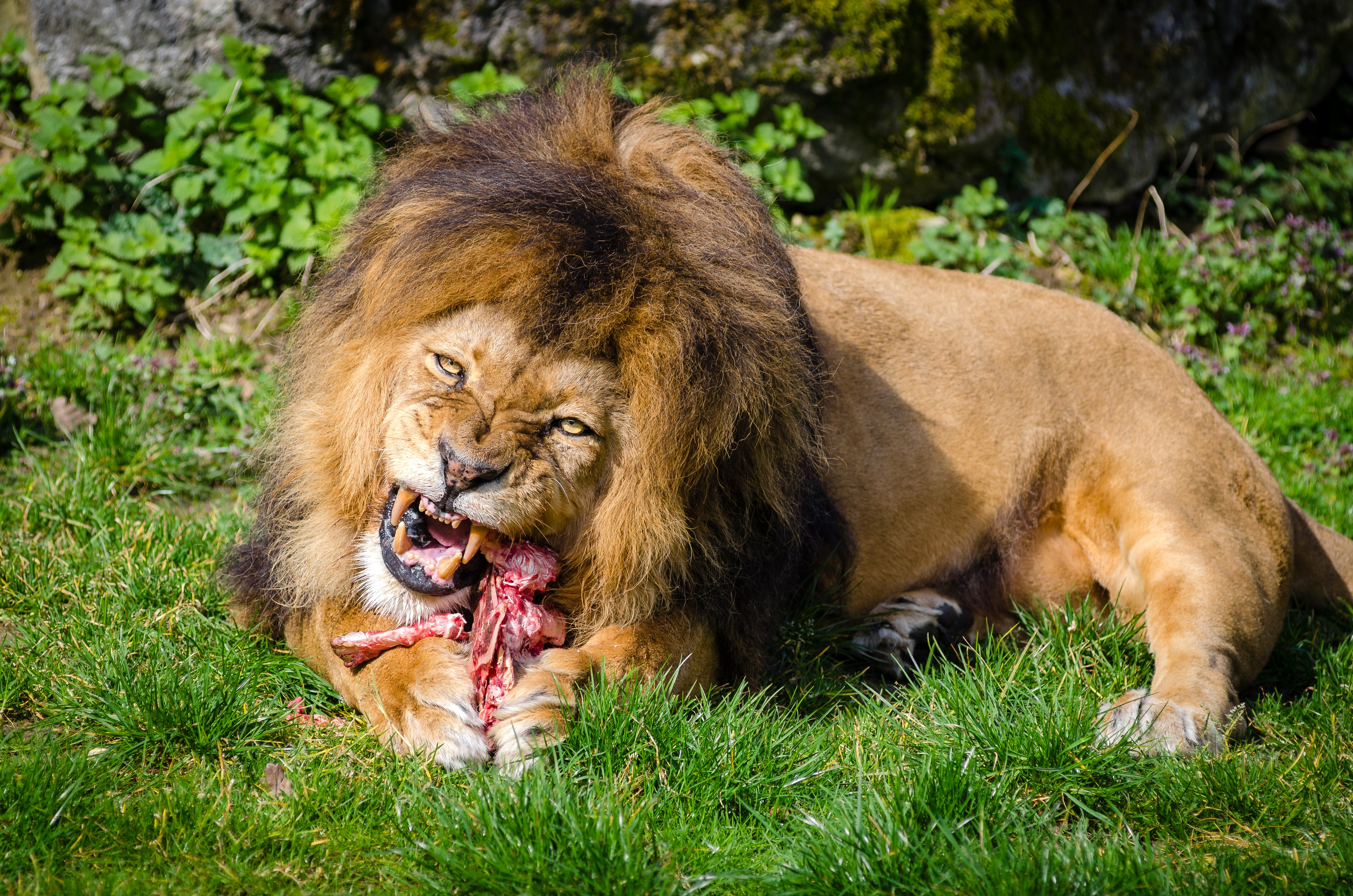
Lions are obligate carnivores, since they consume only animal flesh for their nutritional requirements.

A carnivore /ˈkɑːrnɪvɔːr/, or meat-eater (Latin, caro, genitive carnis, meaning meat or flesh and vorare meaning "to devour"), is an animal or plant whose nutrition and energy requirements are met by consumption of animal tissues (mainly muscle, fat and other soft tissues) as food, whether through predation or scavenging.

== Nomenclature ==
=== Mammal order ===
The technical term for mammals in the order Carnivora is carnivoran, and they are so-named because most member species in the group have a carnivorous diet, but the similarity of the name of the order and the name of the diet causes confusion.

Many but not all carnivorans are meat eaters; a few, such as the large and small cats (Felidae) are obligate carnivores whose diet requires nutrients found only in animal flesh. Other classes of carnivore are highly variable. The ursids (bears), for example: while the Arctic polar bear eats meat almost exclusively (more than 90% of its diet is meat), almost all other bear species are omnivorous, and one species, the giant panda, is nearly exclusively herbivorous.

Dietary carnivory is not a distinguishing trait of the order. Many mammals with highly carnivorous diets are not members of the order Carnivora. Cetaceans, for example, all eat other animals but are not carnivorans.

=== Carnivorous diet ===
Animals that depend solely on animal flesh for their nutrient requirements in nature are called hypercarnivores or obligate carnivores, whilst those that also consume non-animal food are called mesocarnivores, or facultative carnivores, or omnivores (there are no clear distinctions). A carnivore at the top of the food chain (adults not preyed upon by other animals) is termed an apex predator, regardless of whether it is an obligate or facultative carnivore. In captivity or domestic settings, obligate carnivores like cats and crocodiles can, in principle, get all their required nutrients from processed food made from plant and synthetic sources.

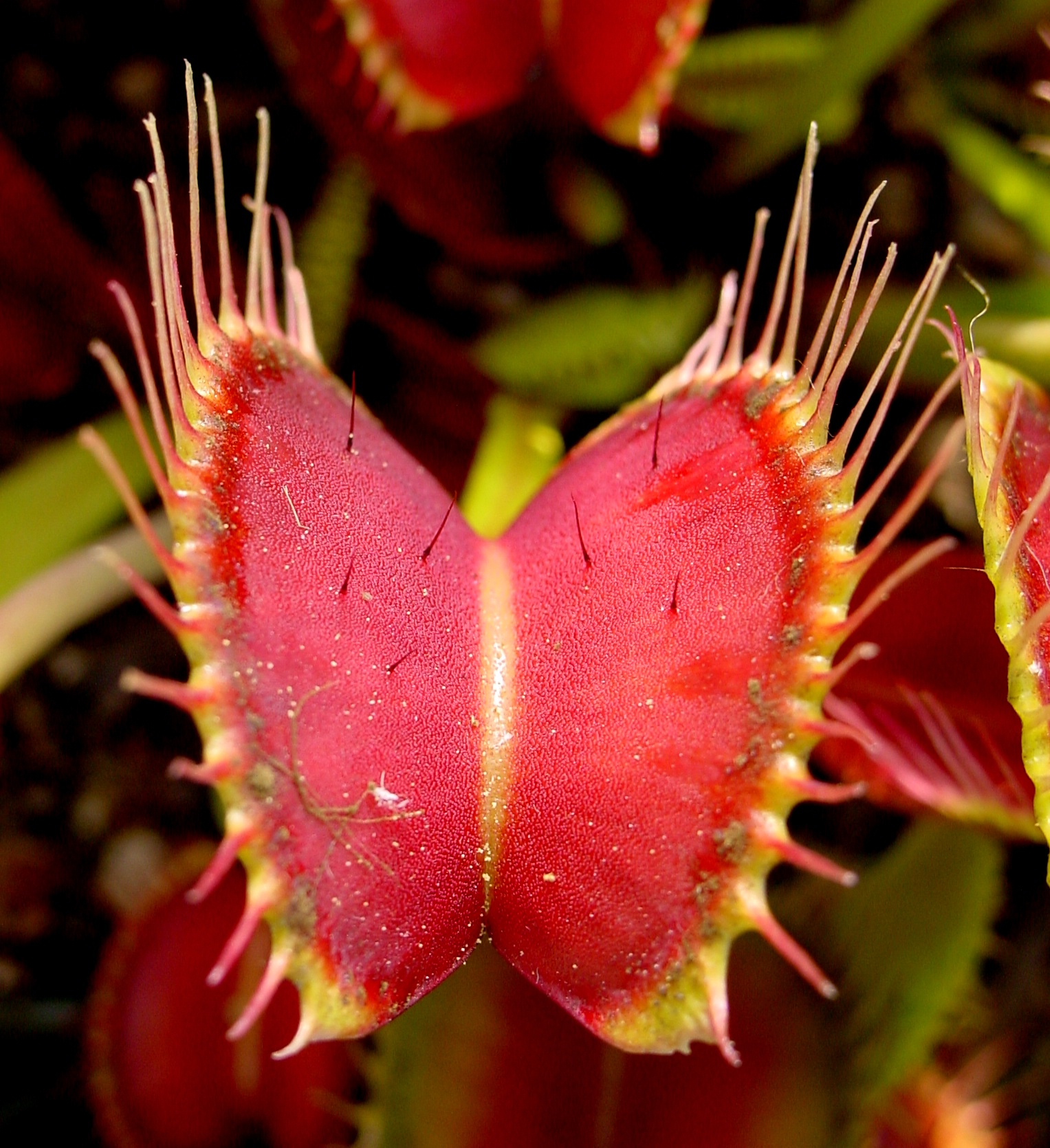
Members of the plant kingdom can live on meat too, such as the Venus flytrap, a carnivorous plant.

Outside the animal kingdom, there are several genera containing carnivorous plants (predominantly insectivores), several phyla containing carnivorous fungi (preying mostly on microscopic invertebrates, such as nematodes, amoebae, and springtails) and carnivorous protists.

=== Subcategories of carnivory ===
Carnivores are sometimes characterized by their type of prey. For example, animals that eat mainly insects and similar terrestrial arthropods are called insectivores, while those that eat mainly soft-bodied invertebrates are called vermivores. Those that eat mainly fish are called piscivores.

Carnivores may alternatively be classified according to the percentage of meat in their diet. The diet of a hypercarnivore consists of more than 70% meat, that of a mesocarnivore 30–70%, and that of a hypocarnivore less than 30%, with the balance consisting of non-animal foods, such as fruit, other plant material, or fungi.

Omnivores also consume both animal and non-animal food, and apart from their more general definition, there is no clearly defined ratio of plant vs. animal material that distinguishes a facultative carnivore from an omnivore.

== Obligate carnivores ==
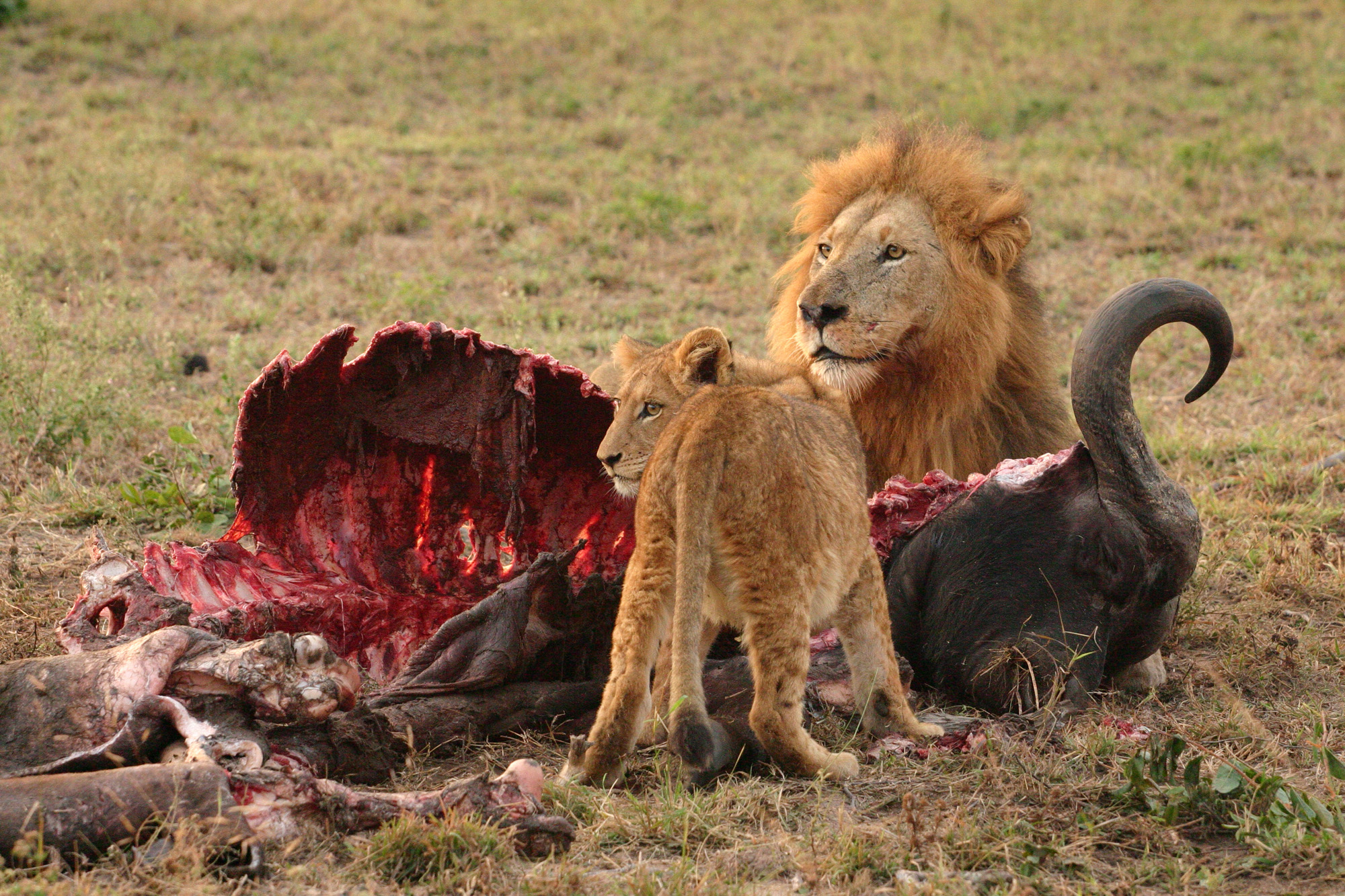
Lions are voracious carnivores; they require more than 7 kilograms of meat daily. A major component of their diet is the meat of large mammals, such as this buffalo.

Obligate or "true" carnivores are those whose diet in the wild requires nutrients found only in animal flesh. While obligate carnivores may be able to ingest small amounts of plant matter, they lack the necessary physiology required to fully digest it. Some obligate carnivorous mammals, such as housecats, will ingest vegetation as an emetic, a food that upsets their stomachs, to self-induce vomiting.

Obligate carnivores are diverse. The amphibian axolotl consumes mainly worms and larvae in its environment, but if necessary will consume algae. All wild felids, including domestic cats, require a diet of primarily animal flesh and organs. Specifically, cats have high protein requirements and their metabolisms appear unable to synthesize essential nutrients such as retinol, arginine, taurine, and arachidonic acid; thus, in nature, they must consume flesh to supply these nutrients.

== Characteristics of carnivores ==
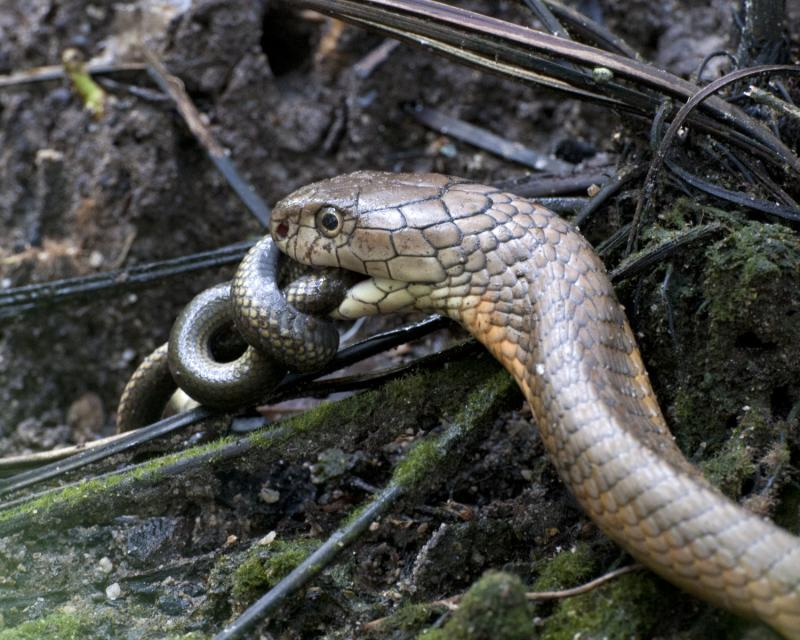
This king cobra is preying on a smaller snake. Such snakes as king cobras use venom to kill prey.

Characteristics commonly associated with carnivores include strength, speed, and keen senses for hunting, as well as teeth and claws for capturing and tearing prey. However, some carnivores do not hunt and are scavengers, lacking the physical characteristics to bring down prey; in addition, most hunting carnivores will scavenge when the opportunity arises. Carnivores have comparatively short digestive systems, as they are not required to break down the tough cellulose found in plants.

Many hunting animals have evolved eyes facing forward, enabling depth perception. This is almost universal among mammalian predators, while most reptile and amphibian predators have eyes facing sideways.

Some carnivores use venom to immobilize and kill prey. Such animals include snakes, spiders, scorpions, and some wasps.

== Prehistory of carnivory ==
Predation (the eating of one living organism by another for nutrition) predates the rise of commonly recognized carnivores by hundreds of millions (perhaps billions) of years. It began with single-celled organisms that phagocytozed and digested other cells, and later evolved into multicellular organisms with specialized cells that were dedicated to breaking down other organisms. Incomplete digestion of the prey organisms, some of which survived inside the predators in a form of endosymbiosis, might have led to symbiogenesis that gave rise to eukaryotes and eukaryotic autotrophs such as green and red algae.

=== Proterozoic origin ===
The earliest predators were microorganisms, which engulfed and "swallowed" other smaller cells (i.e. phagocytosis) and digested them internally. These first predators appeared 1 – over 2.7 bya (billion years ago), the vast uncertainty owing to the poor early fossil record.

The rise of eukaryotic cells at around 2.7 bya, the rise of multicellular organisms at about 2 bya, and the rise of motile predators (around 600 Mya – 2 bya, probably around 1 bya) have all been attributed to early predatory behavior, and many very early remains show evidence of boreholes or other markings attributed to small predator species.

The sudden disappearance of the Precambrian Ediacaran biota at the end-Ediacaran extinction, which were mostly bottom-dwelling filter feeders and grazers, has been hypothetized to be partly caused by increased predation by newer animals with hardened skeleton and mouthparts.

=== Paleozoic ===
The degradation of seafloor microbial mats due to the Cambrian substrate revolution led to increased active predation among animals, likely triggering various evolutionary arms races that contributed to the rapid diversification during the Cambrian explosion. Radiodont arthropods, which produced the first apex predators such as Anomalocaris, quickly became the dominant carnivores of the Cambrian sea. After their decline due to the Cambrian-Ordovician extinction event, the niches of large carnivores were taken over by nautiloid cephalopods such as Cameroceras and later eurypterids such as Jaekelopterus during the Ordovician and Silurian periods.

The first vertebrate carnivores appeared after the evolution of jawed fish, especially armored placoderms such as the massive Dunkleosteus. The dominance of placoderms in the Devonian ocean forced other fish to venture into other niches, and one clade of bony fish, the lobe-finned fish, became the dominant carnivores of freshwater wetlands formed by early land plants. Some of these fish became better adapted for breathing air and eventually giving rise to amphibian tetrapods. These early tetrapods were large semi-aquatic piscivores and riparian ambush predators that hunt terrestrial arthropods (mainly arachnids and myriopods), and one group in particular, the temnospondyls, became terrestrial apex predators that hunt other tetrapods.

The dominance of temnospondyls around the wetland habitats throughout the Carboniferous forced other amphibians to evolve into amniotes that had adaptations that allowed them to live farther away from water bodies. These amniotes began to evolve both carnivory, which was a natural transition from insectivory requiring minimal adaptation; and herbivory, which took advantage of the abundance of coal forest foliage but in contrast required a complex set of adaptations that was necessary for digesting the cellulose- and lignin-rich plant materials. After the Carboniferous rainforest collapse, both synapsid and sauropsid amniotes quickly gained dominance as the top terrestrial animals during the subsequent Permian period. Some scientists assert that sphenacodontoid synapsids such as Dimetrodon "were the first terrestrial vertebrate to develop the curved, serrated teeth that enable a predator to eat prey much larger than itself".

=== Mesozoic ===
In the Mesozoic, some theropod dinosaurs such as Tyrannosaurus rex are thought probably to have been obligate carnivores.

Though the theropods were the larger carnivores, several carnivorous mammal groups were already present. Most notable are the gobiconodontids, the triconodontid Jugulator, the deltatheroidans and Cimolestes. Many of these, such as Repenomamus, Jugulator and Cimolestes, were among the largest mammals in their faunal assemblages, capable of attacking dinosaurs.

=== Cenozoic ===
In the early-to-mid-Cenozoic, the dominant predator forms were mammals: hyaenodonts, oxyaenids, entelodonts, ptolemaiidans, arctocyonids and mesonychians, representing a great diversity of eutherian carnivores in the northern continents and Africa. In South America, sparassodonts were dominant, while Australia saw the presence of several marsupial predators, such as the dasyuromorphs and thylacoleonids. From the Miocene to the present, the dominant carnivorous mammals have been carnivoramorphs.

Most carnivorous mammals, from dogs to deltatheridiums, share several dental adaptations, such as carnassial teeth, long canines and even similar tooth replacement patterns. Most aberrant are thylacoleonids, with a diprodontan dentition completely unlike that of any other mammal; and eutriconodonts like gobiconodontids and Jugulator, with a three-cusp anatomy which nevertheless functioned similarly to carnassials.

== See also ==
- Mesocarnivore
