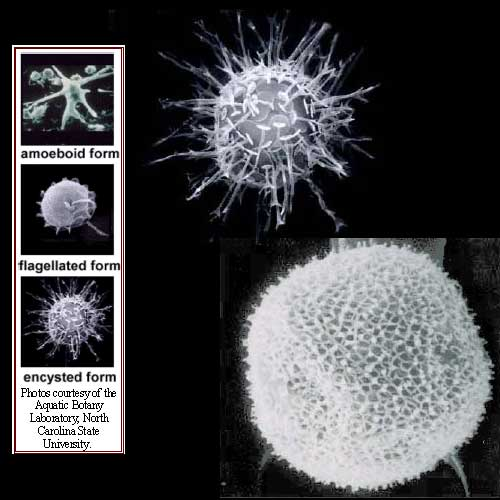

Scientific classification
- Domain: Eukaryota
- Clade: Diaphoretickes
- Clade: SAR
- Clade: Alveolata
- Phylum: Myzozoa
- Superclass: Dinoflagellata
- Class: Dinophyceae
- Order: Thoracosphaerales
- Family: Pfiesteriaceae
- Genus: Pfiesteria

Species
- Pfiesteria piscicida Pfiesteria shumwayae

= Pfiesteria =

Genus of single-celled organisms

Pfiesteria is a genus of heterotrophic dinoflagellates that has been associated with harmful algal blooms and fish kills. Pfiesteria complex organisms (PCOs) were claimed to be responsible for large fish kills in the 1980s and 1990s on the coast of North Carolina and in tributaries of the Chesapeake Bay. In reaction to the toxic outbreaks, six states along the US east coast have initiated a monitoring program to allow for rapid response in the case of new outbreaks and to better understand the factors involved in Pfiesteria toxicity and outbreaks. New molecular detection methods have revealed that Pfiesteria has a worldwide distribution.

== Discovery and naming ==
Pfiesteria was discovered in 1988 by North Carolina State University researchers JoAnn Burkholder and Ed Noga. The genus was named after Lois Ann Pfiester (1936–1992), a biologist who did much of the early research on dinoflagellates.

== Species ==
There are two species described, Pfiesteria piscicida (from Latin Pisces, fish; cida, killer.), which has a complex life cycle and the species Pfiesteria shumwayae, also with a complex life cycle. The type locality of Pfiesteria piscicida is Pamlico River Estuary, North Carolina, U.S.A.

== Feeding strategy ==
Early research resulted in the hypothesis that Pfiesteria is a predatory dinoflagellate that acts as an ambush predator, utilizing a "hit and run" feeding strategy. Release of a toxin paralyzes the respiratory systems of susceptible fish, such as menhaden, causing death by suffocation. Pfiesteria then consumes the tissue sloughed off its dead prey.

== Controversy ==
Pfiesteria biology and the role of PCOs in killing fish and sickening humans have been subject to several controversies and conflicting research results over the last few years.

- Life cycle: Early research suggested a complex lifecycle of Pfiesteria piscicida, but this has become controversial over the past few years due to conflicting research results. Especially contested is the question of whether toxic amoeboid forms exist.
- Toxicity to fish: The hypothesis of Pfiesteria killing fish via releasing a toxin in the water has been questioned as no toxin could be isolated and no toxicity was observed in some experiments. Toxicity appears to depend on the strains and assays used. The lesions observed on fish presumed killed by Pfiesteria have been attributed to water molds by some researchers. However, it has also been established that Pfiesteria shumwayae kills fish by feeding on their skin through myzocytosis. In early 2007, a highly unstable toxin produced by the toxic form of Pfiesteria piscicida was identified.
- Human illness: The effects of PCOs on humans have been questioned, leading to the "Pfiesteria hysteria hypothesis." A critical review of this hypothesis in the late 1990s concluded that Pfiesteria-related illness was unlikely to be caused by mass hysteria. Concluding that there was no evidence to support the existence of Pfiesteria-associated human illness, the National Institutes of Health discontinued funding for research into the effects of Pfiesteria toxin on humans shortly after a CDC sponsored Pfiesteria conference in 2000. A subsequent evaluation, however, concluded that PCOs can cause human illness. The controversy about the risk of Pfiesteria exposure to human health is still ongoing.

== In fiction ==
- A fictional Pfiesteria species dangerous to humans featured in James Powlik's 1999 environmental thriller Sea Change.
- The fictional species Pfiesteria homicida was one of the antagonists in Frank Schätzing's 2004 novel The Swarm. They are a biological weapon created by the yrr, the main antagonists of the novel.
