= JoAnn Burkholder =

American limnologist

JoAnn Marie Burkholder
- Born: 1953 (age 72–73); Rockford, Illinois
- Education: Iowa State University; University of Rhode Island; Michigan State University
- Occupation: aquatic ecology professor
- Known for: Causes of fish deaths

JoAnn Marie Burkholder (born 1953) is an American aquatic ecologist and phycologist known for her research on nutrient pollution (cultural eutrophication), harmful algal blooms, and the biology and toxicity of the dinoflagellate genus Pfiesteria. She is William Neal Reynolds Distinguished Professor in the Department of Applied Ecology at North Carolina State University and founding director of the Center for Applied Aquatic Ecology (CAAE). Her work spans freshwater to marine ecosystems and microalgae to seagrasses, emphasizing the ecological and physiological consequences of nutrient enrichment, the behavior and toxicity of harmful algae, and the integration of science with public outreach, environmental education, and policy.

== Early life ==
She earned a Bachelor of Science in Zoology from Iowa State University in 1975. She continued her studies at the University of Rhode Island, receiving a Master of Science in Aquatic Botany in 1981, followed by a Ph.D. in Botanical Limnology from Michigan State University in 1986. During her early academic training, she conducted research in limnology, marine botany, and plant physiology, gaining expertise in both experimental and field-based aquatic ecology.

== Academic and professional career ==
Burkholder began her professional career as an environmental scientist at EcolSciences, Inc. in New Jersey from 1976 to 1977 and as an undergraduate research assistant in limnology at Iowa State University. During her graduate studies, she held research and teaching assistantships at the University of Rhode Island from 1978 to 1981, where she contributed to botany instruction while conducting research in aquatic and marine plant sciences. She also taught marine botany during summer programs at St. George’s College Preparatory School and served as an instructor of introductory chemistry at Quinebaug Valley Community College in Connecticut. From 1982 to 1986, she was a graduate research assistant at the W.K. Kellogg Biological Station at Michigan State University, participating in long-term ecological research on freshwater ecosystems.

In 1986, Burkholder joined North Carolina State University as an assistant professor in the Department of Botany. She was promoted to associate professor in 1993 and full professor in 1998. From 1998 to 2012, she served as professor in the Department of Plant Biology (formerly Botany) while directing the university’s Center for Applied Aquatic Ecology, establishing it as a hub for interdisciplinary research on water quality, harmful algal blooms, fisheries health, and ecosystem management. In 2013, she was named William Neal Reynolds Distinguished Professor in the Department of Applied Ecology, one of the university’s highest faculty distinctions. She has continued to serve as director of the Center for Applied Aquatic Ecology, overseeing research programs, mentoring graduate students and postdoctoral scholars, and engaging with governmental and community partners on applied ecological issues.

== Research ==
=== Nutrient Pollution and Cultural Eutrophication ===
Burkholder’s research examines the acute and chronic ecological impacts of nutrient over-enrichment in aquatic ecosystems, including reservoirs, streams, estuaries, and coastal marine environments. Her studies have explored how excessive nutrient inputs alter food-web structure, stimulate harmful algal blooms, reduce biodiversity, and degrade ecosystem services. She has conducted research on freshwater source-water reservoirs in North Carolina, documenting interactions between nutrient and sediment loadings and identifying cyanotoxins present at low levels in drinking water supplies. Automated depth-profiling monitoring platforms developed under her guidance have provided real-time data to safeguard water quality for hundreds of thousands of residents.

Her research on streams and estuaries, including the Neuse and Cape Fear rivers, has detailed how nutrient over-enrichment contributes to algal blooms and ecosystem degradation. She synthesized decades of data to demonstrate the impacts of nutrient loading on fish populations, algal community structure, and ecosystem health.

== Harmful Algal Blooms and Ecological Consensus ==
Burkholder has been a key figure in advancing scientific understanding of harmful algal blooms (HABs) as ecological phenomena linked to nutrient enrichment. In 2008 she co‑authored Eutrophication and Harmful Algal Blooms: A Scientific Consensus, which provided a foundational synthesis of evidence showing strong linkages between nutrient over‑enrichment and HAB occurrences across diverse aquatic environments. This consensus paper, widely cited in both ecological science and resource management, brought together specialists from multiple disciplines to articulate why nutrient control is essential for reducing the frequency and severity of HAB events.

In the same period, Burkholder co‑authored Harmful algal blooms and eutrophication: Examining linkages from selected coastal regions of the United States, which documented specific case studies linking nutrient loads to toxic and harmful blooms in U.S. coastal waters and highlighted regional differences in bloom responses to eutrophication.

Her broad engagement with HAB science extended into editorial leadership as co‑editor (with Sandra E. Shumway and Steven L. Morton) of Harmful Algal Blooms: A Compendium Desk Reference, a comprehensive volume addressing causes, impacts, detection, mitigation, and management strategies for HAB species worldwide. Contributions in this reference covered nutrient influences on harmful species such as Prymnesium parvum, cyanobacteria, dinoflagellates, and others, and included sections she co‑authored on Pfiesteria ecology, Prorocentrum physiology, and macroalgal blooms.

=== Dinoflagellates, Pfiesteria, and Toxin Dynamics ===
Burkholder is widely recognized for her research on the toxigenic dinoflagellates Pfiesteria piscicida and Pfiesteria shumwayae and their role in harmful fish kills in nutrient‑enriched estuaries. Her laboratory’s work demonstrated that toxicity is strain‑specific, with some populations capable of producing potent ichthyotoxins while others are not, and that proper assessment of toxicity depends critically on experimental methods and test organisms. This research was published in leading journals, including Proceedings of the National Academy of Sciences, where she and colleagues reaffirmed that some strains of Pfiesteria are toxic and that methodological differences can explain conflicting results in the literature.

Collaborative studies with toxin chemists, ecologists, and toxicologists confirmed that toxic activity from Pfiesteria cultures can be maintained over extended periods and remains biologically active under a variety of conditions, providing evidence that toxic compounds are heat‑stable and persist in culture filtrates, which laid groundwork for later chemical characterization of Pfiesteria toxins by agencies such as NOAA.

Beyond Pfiesteria, Burkholder’s work on harmful dinoflagellate ecology included research on interactions between toxic species and ecologically important bivalve molluscs, demonstrating effects on survival, grazing, and behavioral responses relevant to ecosystem food webs. She also co‑authored studies on growth and developmental responses of Pfiesteria under different conditions and on strategies to cultivate heterotrophic dinoflagellates under axenic conditions to better observe feeding behavior and toxicity expression.

=== Seagrasses and Eutrophication ===
Burkholder, alongside David A. Tomasko and Brant W. Touchette, summarized historical and experimental evidence demonstrating that cultural eutrophication is a major driver of seagrass decline. Their research showed that nutrient enrichment reduces light availability through stimulation of epiphytic algae and macroalgae and identified direct physiological effects of nitrate and ammonium on seagrasses (Zostera marina).

=== Pfiesteria Research ===
Burkholder is widely known for her discovery and characterization of Pfiesteria piscicida and Pfiesteria shumwayae, toxigenic dinoflagellates responsible for fish kills in nutrient-enriched estuaries of the southeastern United States. She demonstrated that toxicity is strain-specific, with populations ranging from non-toxic to highly toxic, and showed that toxic strains attach to fish tissues, feed on cells, and release soluble toxins capable of killing fish without direct contact .

Her laboratory maintained toxic cultures for extended periods, confirming that toxin activity is stable under heat and storage. Collaborative work with Andrew S. Gordon, Peter D. Moeller, and others demonstrated comparative toxicity of Pfiesteria strains and prolonged toxin expression under controlled culture conditions. The chemical characterization of Pfiesteria toxins by Moeller and colleagues, recognized by NOAA, provided definitive evidence of biologically active compounds responsible for ichthyotoxicity. International studies, including Moestrup et al. (2014), confirmed that Pfiesteria can cause fish kills in aquaculture settings, corroborating Burkholder’s findings.

Bioassay sensitivity was shown to depend on fish species, with Oreochromis spp. (Tilapia) more susceptible to Pfiesteria toxins than Cyprinodon variegatus (sheepshead minnow).

=== Mixotrophy and Feeding Ecology ===
Burkholder’s research demonstrated that many harmful algal species, including Pfiesteria, are mixotrophic, combining photosynthesis with heterotrophic feeding. Contrary to prior assumptions that mixotrophy occurs mainly in nutrient-poor environments, her work showed that it is significant in nutrient-rich, prey-abundant estuarine and coastal habitats.

Some algae retain chloroplasts from consumed prey (kleptochloroplasts) for temporary photosynthesis, supporting bloom formation and persistence. This research has informed predictive models of harmful algal bloom dynamics and highlighted ecological and physiological strategies that enable mixotrophic algae to thrive under eutrophic conditions.

=== Freshwater Ecosystems ===
Burkholder’s studies in freshwater reservoirs and streams included documenting cryptic dinoflagellates under episodic sediment loadings, quantifying interactions between nutrient and sediment concentrations in promoting algal blooms, and assessing cyanotoxin prevalence in potable water supplies .

== Public Engagement and Environmental Education ==
Burkholder has emphasized outreach and education across all age groups, from kindergarten students to adult learners, and collaborated with NGOs to improve aquatic ecosystem protection. She has provided testimony to the U.S. Congress on harmful algal blooms, fisheries conservation, and estuarine protection, and has served on advisory bodies related to coastal and fisheries management. Her work illustrates the integration of rigorous science with policy, public awareness, and community-based conservation.

== Awards and honors ==
Burkholder’s recognition includes the Eugene P. Odum Lecture at the University of Georgia (2022), Women of Achievement Award from the General Federation of Women’s Clubs of North Carolina (2016), and Fred A. Harris Fisheries Conservation Award from the American Fisheries Society, North Carolina Chapter (2015).

She received the Borlaug Joint Award for Service to the Environment and Society (2009), was named William Neal Reynolds Distinguished Professor (2008), and earned the J. Compton River Achievement Award (2008).

She is a Fellow of the American Association for the Advancement of Science (2004) and has received numerous research excellence awards, including the Darbaker Prize (2007), Provasoli Award (2003), Hutner Award (1999), and Scientific Freedom and Responsibility Award (1998). She was also recognized as Conservationist of the Year by the National Wildlife Federation and the Governor of North Carolina (1998) and holds honorary doctorates from Knox College (2003) and Southampton College (2001).
