= Anaerobic lagoon =

Manmade earthen basin filled with animal waste that undergoes anaerobic respiration

An anaerobic lagoon or manure lagoon is a man-made outdoor earthen basin filled with animal waste that undergoes anaerobic respiration as part of a system designed to manage and treat refuse created by concentrated animal feeding operations (CAFOs). Anaerobic lagoons are created from a manure slurry, which is washed out from underneath the animal pens and then piped into the lagoon. Sometimes the slurry is placed in an intermediate holding tank under or next to the barns before it is deposited in a lagoon. Once in the lagoon, the manure settles into two layers: a solid or sludge layer and a liquid layer. The manure then undergoes the process of anaerobic respiration, whereby the volatile organic compounds are converted into carbon dioxide and methane. Anaerobic lagoons are usually used to pretreat high-strength industrial wastewaters and municipal wastewaters. This allows for preliminary sedimentation of suspended solids as a pretreatment process.

Anaerobic lagoons have been shown to harbor and emit substances which can cause adverse environmental and health effects. These substances are emitted through two main pathways: gas emissions and lagoon overflow. Gas emissions are continuous (though the amount may vary based on the season) and are a product of the manure slurry. The most prevalent gasses emitted by the lagoon are ammonia, hydrogen sulfide, methane, and carbon dioxide. Lagoon overflow is caused by faulty lagoons, such as breaches or improper construction, or adverse weather conditions, such as increased rainfall or strong winds. These overflows release harmful substances into the surrounding land and water such as: antibiotics, estrogens, bacteria, pesticides, heavy metals, and protozoa.

In the U.S., the Environmental Protection Agency (EPA) has responded to environmental and health concerns by strengthening regulation of CAFOs under the Clean Water Act. Some states have imposed their own regulations as well. Because of repeated overflows and resultant health concerns, North Carolina banned the construction of new anaerobic lagoons in 1999. There has also been a significant push for the research, development and implementation of environmentally sound technologies which would allow for safer containment and recycling of CAFO waste.

== Background ==
Beginning in the 1950s with poultry production, and then later in the 1970s and 1980s with cattle and swine, meat producers in the United States have turned to CAFOs as a way to more efficiently produce large quantities of meat. This switch has decreased the price of meat. However, the increase in livestock has generated an increase in manure. In 2006, for example, livestock operations in the United States produced 133 million short tons (121,000,000 tonnes) of manure. CAFO manure often has lower usable nutrient content than “as-excreted” or fresh manure, because of dilution, losses during storage, and mismatches between nutrient ratios and crop demands. In addition, the very large volumes produced in confined locations often exceed what nearby cropland can absorb, making transport costly and increasing the risk of oversupply of nitrogen and phosphorus and resulting runoff and pollution. For example, a feeding operation with 800,000 pigs can produce over 1.6 million short tons (1,500,000 tonnes) of waste per year. The high quantity of manure produced by a CAFO must be dealt with in some way, as improper manure management can result in water, air and soil damage. As a result, manure collection and disposal has become an increasing problem.

In order to manage their waste, CAFOs have developed agricultural wastewater treatment plans. To save on manual labor, many CAFOs handle manure waste as a liquid. In this system, the animals are kept in pens with grated floors so the waste and spray water can be drained from underfloor gutters and piped to storage tanks or anaerobic lagoons. Once at a lagoon, the purpose is to treat the waste and make it suitable for spreading on agricultural fields. There are three main types of lagoon: anaerobic, which is inhibited by oxygen; aerobic, which requires oxygen; and facultative, which is maintained with or without oxygen. Aerobic lagoons provide a higher degree of treatment with less odor production, though they require a significant amount of space and maintenance. Because of this demand, almost all livestock lagoons are anaerobic lagoons.

== Design ==
=== Description ===
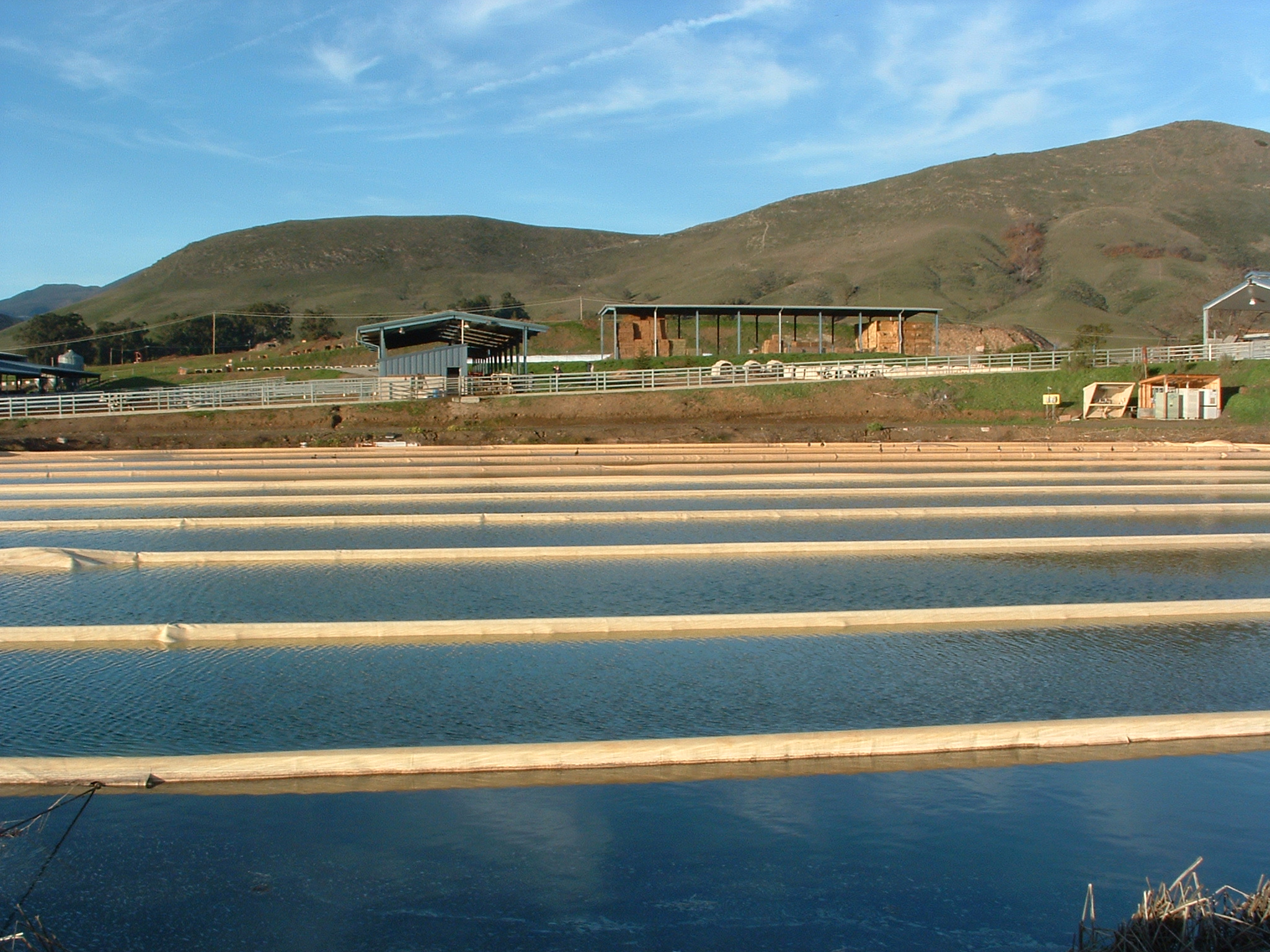
Anaerobic treatment lagoon at the Cal Poly Dairy

Anaerobic lagoons are earthen basins with a usual depth of 8 feet (2.4 metres), though greater depths are more beneficial to digestion as they minimize oxygen diffusion from the surface. To minimize leakage of animal waste into the ground water, newer lagoons are generally lined with clay. Studies have shown that in fact the lagoons typically leak at a rate of approximately 1 millimetre (0.04 inches) per day, with or without a clay liner, because it is the sludge deposited at the base of the lagoon that limits the leakage rate, not the clay liner or underlying native soil.

Anaerobic lagoons are not heated, aerated or mixed. Anaerobic lagoons are most effective in warmer temperatures; anaerobic bacteria are ineffective below 15 °C (59 °F). Lagoons must be separated from other structures by a certain distance to prevent contamination. States regulate this separation distance. The overall size of the lagoon is determined by the addition of four components: minimum design volume, volume of manure storage between periods of disposal, dilution volume and the volume of sludge accumulation between periods of sludge removal.

=== Process ===
The lagoon is divided into two distinct layers: sludge and liquid. The sludge layer is a more solid layer formed by the stratification of sediments from the manure. After a while, this solid layer accumulates and eventually needs to be cleaned out. The liquid level is composed of grease, scum and other particulates. The liquid level CAFO wastewater enters at the bottom of the lagoon so that it can mix with the active microbial mass in the sludge layer. These anaerobic conditions are uniform throughout the lagoon, except in a small surface level.

Sometimes aeration is applied to this level to dampen the odors emitted by the lagoons. If surface aeration is not applied, a crust will form that will trap heat and odors. Anaerobic lagoons should retain and treat wastewater for 20 to 150 days. Lagoons should be followed by aerobic or facultative lagoons to provide further required treatment. The liquid layer is periodically drained and used for fertilizer. In some instances, a cover can be provided to trap methane, which is used for energy.

Anaerobic lagoons work through a process called anaerobic digestion. Decomposition of the organic matter begins shortly after the animals void. Lagoons become anaerobic because of the high biological oxygen demand (BOD) of the feces, which contains a high level of soluble solids, resulting in higher BOD. Anaerobic microorganisms convert organic compounds into carbon dioxide and methane through acid formation and methane production.

=== Advantages of construction ===
- Manure can be easily manipulated with water using flushing systems, sewer lines, pumps and irrigation systems
- Stabilization of the waste through digestion minimizes odor when manure is finally used as fertilizer
- Manure is able to be stored long-term at a low cost
- Manure is all in one area, instead of spread across a large area of land (This is called W.E.S., Waste Enlargement System).

=== Disadvantages of construction ===
- Requires a relatively large area of land
- Produces strong undesirable odors especially during spring and fall
- Takes a fairly long time for organic stabilization because of the slow rate of sludge digestion and slow growth rate of methane formers
- Manure used as fertilizer is of lower quality because of low nutrient availability
- Wastewater seepage may occur if the tanks break or are improperly constructed
- Weather and other environmental elements can strongly affect the safety and efficacy of anaerobic lagoons

== Environmental and health impacts ==
=== Gas emissions ===
Rates of asthma in children living near a CAFO are consistently elevated. The process of anaerobic digestion has been shown to release over 400 volatile compounds from lagoons. The most prevalent of these are: ammonia, hydrogen sulfide, methane, and carbon dioxide.

==== Ammonia (NH_{3}) ====
In the United States, 80% of ammonia emissions come from livestock production. A lagoon can vaporize up to 80% of its nitrogen through the reaction: NH_{4}^{+}-N ⇌ NH_{3} + H^{+}. As pH or temperature increases, so does the amount of volatilized ammonia. Once ammonia has been volatilized, it can travel as far as 300 miles, and at closer ranges it is a respiratory irritant. Acidification and eutrophication of the ecosystem surrounding the lagoons could be caused by prolonged exposure to volatilized ammonia. This volatilized ammonia has been implicated in widespread ecological damage in Europe and is of growing concern for the United States.

==== Hydrogen sulfide (H_{2}S) ====
With averages greater than 30 parts per billion (ppb), lagoons have high concentrations of hydrogen sulfide, which is highly toxic. A study by the Minnesota Pollution Control Agency has found that concentrations of hydrogen sulfide near lagoons have exceeded the state standard, even as far away as 4.9 miles. Hydrogen sulfide is recognizable for its unpleasant rotten-egg odor. Because hydrogen sulfide is heavier than air, it tends to linger around lagoons even after ventilation. Levels of hydrogen sulfide are at their highest after agitation and during manure removal.

==== Methane (CH_{4}) ====
Methane is an odorless, tasteless, and colorless gas. Lagoons produce about 2,300,000 tonnes per year, with around 40% of this mass coming from hog farm lagoons. Methane is combustible at high temperatures, and explosions and fires are a real threat at or near lagoons. Additionally, methane is a greenhouse gas. The U.S. EPA estimated that 13% of all the methane emissions came from livestock manure in 1998, and this number has grown in recent years. Recently there has been interest in technology which would capture methane produced from lagoons and sell it as energy.

=== Water-soluble contaminants ===
Contaminants that are water-soluble can escape from anaerobic lagoons and enter the environment through leakage from badly constructed or poorly maintained manure lagoons as well as during excess rain or high winds, resulting in an overflow of lagoons. These leaks and overflows can contaminate surrounding surface and ground water with some hazardous materials which are contained in the lagoon. The most serious of these contaminants are pathogens, antibiotics, heavy metals and hormones. For example, runoff from farms in Maryland and North Carolina are a leading candidate for Pfiesteria piscicida. This contaminant has the ability to kill fish, and it can also cause skin irritation and short-term memory loss in humans.

==== Pathogens ====
More than 150 pathogens in manure lagoons have been found to impact human health. Healthy individuals who come into contact with pathogens usually recover promptly. However, those who have a weakened immune system, such as cancer patients and young children, have an increased risk for a more severe illness or even death. About 20% of the U.S. population are categorized in this risk group. Some of the more notable pathogens are:

===== E. coli =====
E. coli is found in the intestines and feces of both animals and humans. One particularly virulent strain, Escherichia coli O157:H7, is found specifically in the lumen of cattle raised in CAFOs. Because cattle are fed corn in CAFOs instead of grass, this changes the pH of the lumen so that it is more hospitable to E. coli. Grain-fed cattle have 80% more of this strain of E. coli than grass-fed cattle. However, the amount of E. coli found in the lumen of grain-fed cattle can be significantly reduced by switching an animal to grass only a few days prior to slaughter. This reduction would decrease the pathogen's presence in both meat and waste of the cattle, and decrease the E. coli population found in anaerobic lagoons.

===== Cryptosporidium =====
Cryptosporidium is a parasite that causes diarrhea, vomiting, stomach cramps and fever. It is particularly problematic because it is resistant to most lagoon treatment regimens. In a study performed in Canada, 37% of swine liquid manure samples contained Cryptosporidium.

===== Other common pathogens =====
Other common pathogens (and their symptoms) include:

- Bacillus anthracis, otherwise known as anthrax (skin sores, headache, fever, chills, nausea, vomiting)
- Leptospira pomona (abdominal pain, muscle pain, vomiting, fever)
- Listeria monocytogenes (fever, fatigue, nausea, vomiting, diarrhea)
- Salmonella (abdominal pain, diarrhea, nausea, chills, fever, headache)
- Clostridium tetani (violent muscle spasms, lockjaw, difficulty breathing)
- Histoplasma capsulatum (fever, chills, muscle ache, cough rash, joint pain and stiffness)
- Microsporum and Trichophyton ringworm (itching, rash)
- Giardia lamblia (abdominal pain, abdominal gas, nausea, vomiting, fever)
- Cryptosporidium (diarrhea, dehydration, weakness, abdominal cramping)
- Pfiesteria piscicida (neurological damage)

==== Antibiotics ====
Antibiotics are fed to livestock to prevent disease and to increase weight and development, so that there is a shortened time from birth to slaughter. However, because these antibiotics are administered at sub-therapeutic levels, bacterial colonies can build up resistance to the drugs through the natural selection of bacteria resistant to these antibiotics. These antibiotic-resistant bacteria are then excreted and transferred to the lagoons, where they can infect humans and other animals.

Each year, 24.6 million pounds of antimicrobials are administered to livestock for non-therapeutic purposes. Seventy percent of all antibiotics and related drugs are given to animals as feed additives. Nearly half of the antibiotics used are nearly identical to ones given to humans. There is strong evidence that the use of antibiotics in animal feed is contributing to an increase in antibiotic-resistant microbes and causing antibiotics to be less effective for humans. Due to concerns over antibiotic-resistant bacteria, the American Medical Association passed a resolution stating its opposition to the use of sub-therapeutic levels of antimicrobials in livestock.

==== Hormones ====
Growth hormones such as rBST, estrogen, and testosterone are administered to increase development rate and muscle mass for the livestock. Yet, only a fraction of these hormones are actually absorbed by the animal. The rest are excreted and wind up in lagoons. Studies have shown that these hormones, if they escape the lagoon and are emitted into the surrounding surface water, can alter fertility and reproductive habits of aquatic animals.

One study found that several lagoons and monitoring wells from two facilities (a nursery and a farrowing sow operation) contained high levels of all three types of estrogen: for the nursery, lagoon effluent concentrations ranged from 390 to 620 ng/L for estrone, 180 to 220 ng/L for estriol, and 40 to 50 ng/L for estradiol. For the farrowing sow operation, digester and primary lagoon effluent concentrations ranged from 9,600 to 24,900 ng/L for estrone, 5,000 to 10,400 ng/L for estriol, and 2,200 to 3,000 ng/L for estradiol. Ethinylestradiol was not detected in any of the lagoon or ground water samples. Natural estrogen concentrations in ground water samples were generally less than 0.4 ng/L, although, a few wells at the nursery operation showed quantifiable but low levels."

==== Heavy metals ====
Manure contains trace elements of many heavy metals such as arsenic, cadmium, copper, iron, lead, manganese, molybdenum, nickel, and zinc. Sometimes these metals are given to animals as growth stimulants, some are introduced through pesticides used to rid livestock of insects, and some might pass through the animals as undigested food. Trace elements of these metals and salts from animal manure present risks to human health and ecosystems.

=== New River spill ===
In 1999, Hurricane Floyd hit North Carolina, flooding hog waste lagoons, releasing 25 million gallons of manure into the New River and contaminating the water supply. Ronnie Kennedy, county director for environmental health, said that of 310 private wells he had tested for contamination since the storm, 9%, or three times the average across eastern North Carolina, had fecal coliform bacteria. Normally, tests showing any hint of feces in drinking water, an indication that it can be carrying disease-causing pathogens, are cause for immediate action.

== Regulation ==
Anaerobic lagoons are built as part of a wastewater operation system. As such, compliance and permitting are handled as an extension of that operation. Therefore, manure lagoons are regulated on the state and national level through the CAFO which operates them. In recent years, because of the environmental and health effects associated with anaerobic lagoons, the EPA has increased regulation of CAFOs with a specific eye towards lagoons. North Carolina banned the construction of new anaerobic lagoons in 1999 and upheld that ban in 2007.

== Further research ==
Some research has been done to develop and assess the economic feasibility of more environmentally superior technologies (ESTs). Five main alternatives which have been implemented in North Carolina are: a solids separation/nitrification–denitrification/soluble phosphorus removal system; a thermophilic anaerobic digester system; a centralized composting system; a gasification system; and a fluidized-bed combustion system. These systems were judged based on their ability to: reduce impacts of CAFO waste in the surface and groundwater, decrease ammonia emissions, decrease the escape of disease-transmitting pathogens, and lower the concentration of heavy metal contamination.

The U.S. Department of Agriculture (USDA) has also evaluated the prospect of creating a cap and trade program for CAFOs' carbon dioxide and nitrous oxide emissions. This program has yet to be implemented, however the USDA speculates that such a program would encourage corporations to adopt EST practices.

A comprehensive study of anaerobic swine lagoons nationwide has been launched by the USDA Agricultural Research Service (ARS). This study aims to explore the composition of lagoons and anaerobic lagoon influence on environmental factors and agronomic practices.

== See also ==
- Agricultural wastewater treatment
- Anaerobic digestion
- Aerated lagoon
- Factory farming
- List of waste water treatment technologies
- Sewage treatment
