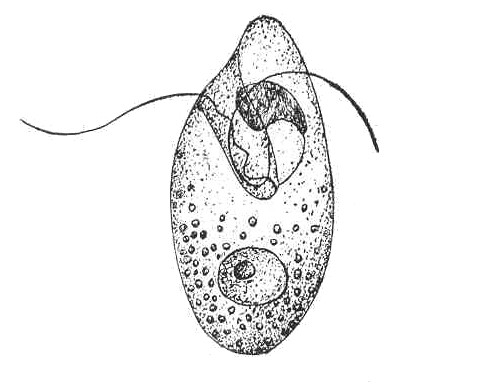
- Oxyrrhis marina

Scientific classification
- Domain: Eukaryota
- Supergroup: Alveolata
- Division: Dinoflagellata
- Class: Oxyrrhidophyceae
- Order: Oxyrrhinales; Sournia, 1984
- Family: Oxyrrhinaceae; Sournia, 1984
- Genus: Oxyrrhis; Dujardin, 1841

Species
- Oxyrrhis marina Dujardin 1841; Oxyrrhis parasitica Poche 1903

= Oxyrrhis =

Genus of single-celled organisms

Oxyrrhis is a genus of heterotrophic dinoflagellate, the only genus in the family Oxyrrhinaceae. It inhabits a range of marine environments worldwide and is important in the food web dynamics of these ecosystems. It has the potential to be considered a model organism for the study of other protists. Oxyrrhis is an early-branching lineage and has long been described in literature as a monospecific genus, containing only Oxyrrhis marina. Some recent molecular phylogenetic studies argue that Oxyrrhis comprises O. marina and O. maritima as distinct species, while other publications state that the two are genetically diverse lineages of the same species. The genus has previously been suggested to contain O. parasitica as a separate species, however the current consensus appears to exclude this, with Oxyrrhis being monospecific and containing O. marina and O. maritima as separate lineages of the type species. The genus is characterised by its elongated body which is anteriorly prolonged to a point, its complex flagellar apparatuses which attach to the ventral side of the cell, and the unique features of its nucleus.

== Etymology ==
The name Oxyrrhis is derived from the Greek oxys, meaning 'sharp' and rhis, meaning 'nose'. This indicates the anterior extension of the body.

== Type species ==
The type species for this genus is Oxyrrhis marina.

== History of knowledge ==
Oxyrrhis was first described by Félix Dujardin in 1841, having been discovered in a salt marsh habitat in Belgium. There is a broad scope of literature concerning the genus, as it is commonly used in laboratory studies investigating the evolution of protist lineages and responses to environmental changes. The amount of knowledge relating to O. marina is rapidly increasing, with the number of publications having greatly risen in the 1990s. It has been suggested that Oxyrrhis could be an "emerging model organism" as it is widely distributed, small, easily traceable, and useful in addressing a range of ecological questions. Because of this, there is currently good knowledge of the growth, feeding and swimming behavior of Oxyrrhis. [4] Its responses to various stimuli, particularly chemical stimuli, are also well studied and have been included in numeric models assessing a range of ecological processes, giving rise to the rapidly increasing number of citations. Additionally, Oxyrrhis is a food source for several planktivores, so there is some data relating to predation rates upon it.

Between 1938 and 2009, 144 papers were published that featured Oxyrrhis as a keyword. In a survey of 36 papers from 1990-2011 that mention O. marina in the title, approximately 55% were aut- or synecologically based, roughly 40% examined an aspect related to evolutionary or genetic biology, and 5% were associated with distributional patterns. However, only around 5-10% of these papers showed any evidence of rigorous cross-disciplinary evaluation.

== Habitat and ecology ==
Oxyrrhis is widely regarded as having global distribution, but there are limited studies of its geographic range. Most published data describe the range of Oxyrrhis as areas of the Atlantic and Pacific coasts of the USA, the Gulf of Mexico, the Atlantic coasts of Europe, the Mediterranean and Baltic Seas, the Persian Gulf, the Indian Ocean, and the western Pacific. Its presence has been confirmed in the southern hemisphere, such as in or around Australia, South Africa, Brazil, and it is rare or absent in polar seas (northern Norway, Iceland), however there have been small sample sizes in these polar regions. Oxyrrhis is rare in open water but has been found to inhabit the coastal waters of some remote islands including Hawaii and the Azores. The genus shows both widespread distributions and endemicity through its various clades. It has been discovered that one clade of O. marina has widespread distribution, covering both coasts of North America and the eastern Mediterranean Sea, while the other clade is only found in the Baltic Sea and Red Sea.

In terms of habitat, Oxyrrhis is common in many intertidal and coastal habitats. There is potential sampling bias when assessing its distribution, as virtually all samples have been from coastal areas, mainly intertidal pools, rather than the open ocean. Oxyrrhis is unlikely to be exclusively intertidal and is probably a small component of coastal and oceanic plankton communities, while there is anecdotal evidence that it occasionally grows in shallow embayments.

Differences in the temperature and salinity ranges of O. marina and O. maritima suggest that the two lineages have different ecophysiology. O. maritima lives in tidal pools with a relatively high salinity and temperature, while O. marina lives in water columns which have a lower salinity and temperature. The highest temperature for positive growth of O. marina is likely to be around 32 °C and 32 °C or higher for O. maritima. O. marina only grows at a salinity >=4 ppt and the growth rate increases with salinity up to 50 ppt. O. maritima grows at a salinity of 2 ppt, and growth rate also increases up until 50 ppt.

Oxyrrhis is highly important in marine communities, playing an essential role in pelagic food webs as they both consume phytoplankton in addition to ciliates, bacteria, and the eggs, early nauplii stages, and adults of some metazoans, amongst other prey items. They additionally act as prey for upper trophic levels, which include some metazoans, ciliates and other dinoflagellates. These consumption rates by Oxyrrhis can exceed 60% of the daily phytoplankton production in many of oceanic and coastal systems. By feeding on and being predated upon by a broad range of organisms, Oxyrrhis significantly affect food web structure, carbon cycles and energy flows within the marine planktonic community.

== Description of the organism ==
=== Morphology/anatomy ===
Dujardin described Oxyrrhis as easily recognisable by its oblong, irregular, obliquely truncated shape, and by its flagelliform filaments. Each cell is ovoid in shape, colourless or pale pink when concentrated, with an approximate length of 50μm. The body is indented in the front and prolonged to a point, with several flagelliform filaments starting laterally from the bottom of the notch.

The cell membrane of Oxyrrhis contains mannose-binding lectin, which may be used to distinguish between prey species. This unique membrane composition could enable Oxyrrhis to analyze aspects of the cell-surface biochemistry of individual prey items to determine their nutritional value, allowing it to select the non-self microalgal prey items which have the highest nutritional quality. Oxyrrhis might possess feeding receptors such as contact chemoreceptors or lectin-like receptors to recognize carbohydrate moieties, which are cell surface components of their marine microalgal and bacterial prey, allowing for highly specific ingestion behaviours.

Recent studies have detailed the flagellar apparatuses of Oxyrrhis that were originally noted by Dujardin. Unlike most dinoflagellates, both flagella emerge from the ventral side of the cell in Oxyrrhis, and the three-dimensional structure of these flagella is similar to that of some Gymnodinium species. These apparatuses are asymmetric and very complex, with each flagellum having a longitudinal and a transverse basal body, giving rise to eight structurally different components. The only component located at the posterior end of the flagellum is the large microtubular root, which has 45-50 individual microtubules at its origin and is connected proximally to a perpendicularly oriented striated fibrous component. The striated fibrous roots that arise from each basal body show similarities to the costa of some trichomonads, despite these organisms having different mitotic mechanisms. A striated fibrous connective attaches to the basal body and extends towards the cell's right ventral surface before terminating at the sub-thecal microtubular system. A compound root originates at the longitudinal basal body and extends ventrally into the anterior region of the flagellum. Several of these roots contain microtubules and electron-dense material. The two flagella work together to generate the propulsion to move Oxyrrhis through the water. The morphological and functional differences between the two flagella mean that Oxyrrhis swims in a helical pattern.

The nucleus of Oxyrrhis has several similarities with those of other dinoflagellates. For instance, throughout the cellular cycle, the nuclear chromosomes remain condensed, and as with other dinoflagellates, there are fewer of the proteins that make up the structural basis of nucleosomes than is typically seen in the chromatin of eukaryotes. Another similarity between the nuclei of Oxyrrhis and other dinoflagellates is that trans-splicing occurs in mRNAs that are nucleus encoded. Additionally, the mitochondrial genome of Oxyrrhis is highly fragmented and the mitochondrial mRNAs use non-canonical start codons (ATA, ATT, TTG, and GTG).

Some aspects of Oxyrrhis' nuclear and chromosomal organization are unique, distinguishing it from other genera. For example, rather than using an extranuclear spindle as typically seen in dinoflagellates, mitosis in Oxyrrhis is facilitated by the use of an intranuclear spindle. Furthermore, a feature not seen in other dinoflagellates is the development of the nuclear plaque, from which the spindle is generated, inside of the nuclear envelope. Other unique features of Oxyrrhis include their many long, thin chromosomes that are separated by many electron-dense bodies, in addition to a single histone-like DNA-associated protein which is not found in other dinoflagellates. Additionally, Oxyrrhis lack a girdle, sulcus, and pustules, differentiating them from other dinoflagellates in this regard.

=== Life cycles ===
Oxyrrhis is generally considered to be haploid, but its true ploidy is uncertain. Like other dinoflagellates, Oxyrrhis populations grow by undergoing vegetative binary fission. When triggered, haploid cells either fuse to form a motile diploid zygote or form a resting cyst, taking on the role of gametes in either case. The diploid cells divide once by meiosis to give rise to haploid cells.

However, some aspects of the life cycles of O. marina differ from those of typical dinoflagellates. During division, the nuclear envelope does not invaginate to form cytoplasmic channels with microtubules present, as in other dinoflagellates, and instead the microtubular mitotic apparatus is intranuclear. Typically in dinoflagellates, the movement of chromosomes is driven by microtubules through the nuclear envelope, but in O. marina this occurs directly through microtubules, without involvement of the nuclear envelope. Additionally, O. marina has not been found to exhibit the birefringent periodic banded or arched chromosomal structure that is typically observed in dinoflagellates. The chromosomes of eukaryotes typically divide solely during the mitosis phase, however in O. marina this may occur throughout most of the cell cycle.

=== Genetics ===
Oxyrrhis has the smallest gene complement known, with several rRNA fragments and only two protein coding genes, cox1 and a cob-cox3 fusion. Its genome is highly fragmented, like that of other dinoflagellates, but the genes are frequently arranged as tandem copies, similar to the repeating nature of the Plasmodium genome. The genome of Oxyrrhis appears to be structured as neighboring genes or gene fragments, and these are always the same. This means the cox1 and the cob-cox3 fusion are never found on the same genomic fragment. Neither cox1, cob-cox3, nor circularized mRNAs from cob-cox3 have been found to use canonical start or stop codons. Additionally, Oxyrrhis does not exhibit the extensive RNA editing that is characteristic of the dinoflagellates.

== Practical importance ==
O. marina meets a range of criteria that combined, could deem it suitable as a 'model organism' for answering many different types of questions relating to other similar protists. O. marina is becoming increasingly recognized as a model in ecology, evolution, and biogeography. This is because it is easy to culture, so there is good knowledge of its ecological characteristics and responses to chemical stimuli, and these have been embedded into a range of ecological models.

O. marina is rarely pelagic or found in open oceans, which could diminish its ability to be used as a model for protists found in these ecosystems. However, it has been used in studies focusing on various processes concerning marine planktonic protozoa, an important component of pelagic food web dynamics. Therefore, the consensus appears to be that although imperfect, the use of O. marina as an ecological model organism will continue.

O. marina is becoming increasingly important in the study of alveolates, particularly other dinoflagellates, with regard to their cellular and molecular features and how these evolved. This is due to the early divergence of O. marina from the branch leading to the dinoflagellate lineage, resulting in shared morphological, cytological and genetic features with closely related taxa, in addition to some characteristics that are species specific. Anexic maintenance of O. marina has been achieved through advances in culturing strategies. This, in addition to high-throughput sequencing becoming more accessible, means that O. marina is likely to be increasingly used in evolutionary and comparative genomic studies of alveolates in the near future.

Furthermore, due to its wide geographic range, O. marina can also be used as a model in determining the drivers of protist distribution and dispersal. The pattern and distribution of its clades has the potential for use in examining the relative influences of evolutionary processes, historical events, and anthropogenic influences on biodiversity patterns within the free-living marine protists. For instance, O. marina has been used to investigate the impacts of infochemicals, such as the environmentally important trace gas dimethyl sulfide, on foraging behaviours. This has given insight into how changing distributions of chemical cues in the environment can influence predator-prey interactions among related genera.

In addition to its use as a model organism, an important practical use of O. marina is to control the toxic red tides produced by the raphidophyte species Heterosigma akashiwo, which kill organisms at all trophic levels. During laboratory experiments, O. marina effectively controls populations of H. akashiwo through grazing. Calculated impacts on natural populations suggest that large-scale culturing of O. marina could be used to successfully manage the red tides that result from H. akashiwo blooms. Additionally, Oxyrrhis is used in fish food, to enhance larval survival in aquaculture and the tropical fish trade due to its ease of mass culturing and potentially high nutritional quality. The feeding of Oxyrrhis to larval fish in aquaculture could lead into future research on the role of protozoa as a food source for larval fish in natural waters.

== List of species and lower taxonomic units ==
Species: O. marina

Diverse lineages within species: O. marina and O. maritima, each comprising two clades, giving four clades in total which contain many strains.
