= Lois Ann Pfiester =

American phycologist and protistologist (1936–1992)

- Born: Elizabeth Lois Ann Pfiester; November 20, 1936; Louisville, Kentucky
- Died: September 28, 1992 (aged 55)

Academic background
- Education: Spalding University; Murray State University; Ohio State University
- Thesis: Peridinium cinctum f. ovoplanum Lindemann (1974)
- Doctoral advisor: Clarence E. Taft

Academic work
- Discipline: Phycology; Protistology
- Institutions: University of Oklahoma

Lois Ann Pfiester (November 20, 1936 – September 28, 1992) was an American phycologist and protistologist, specializing in freshwater dinoflagellate species.

== Career ==
Pfiester received her A.B. from Spalding University in 1965, her M.A. from Murray State University in 1970, and her Ph.D. in botany from Ohio State University in 1974. She joined the faculty of the botany department at the University of Oklahoma as an assistant professor in 1974, and was a full professor there at the time of her death in 1992. She directed four doctoral dissertations, and was the author or coauthor of over 75 journal articles.

In 1978 she went to Prague for four weeks to work with the protistologist Jiří Popovský. The two colleagues identified more than 30 different stages to the life cycle of dinoflagellates of the genus Cystodinedria.

Pfiester was an associate editor for the Journal of Phycology from 1980 to 1988. In 1990 she was the president of the Phycological Society of America.

She was an internationally recognized expert on dinoflagellates, especially the genus Peridinium. She was the first to study dinoflagellate life history using light, scanning, and electron transmission microscopy.

In 1988 North Carolina State University researchers JoAnn Burkholder and Edward Noga discovered a new dinoflagellate genus which they named Pfiesteria in honor of Lois Ann Pfiester.

== Personal life ==
In 1978 Pfiester married L. Dee Fink, another professor at the University of Oklahoma. In 1982 they adopted a son, Andrew Fink, and in 1983 a daughter, Laura Fink.
