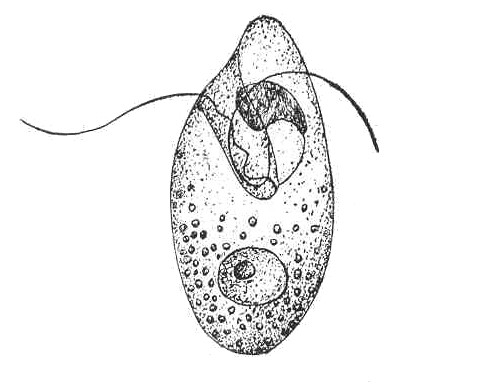

Scientific classification
- Domain: Eukaryota
- Clade: Sar
- Clade: Alveolata
- Division: Dinoflagellata
- Class: Oxyrrhidophyceae
- Order: Oxyrrhinales
- Family: Oxyrrhinaceae
- Genus: Oxyrrhis
- Species: O. marina

Binomial name
- Oxyrrhis marina Dujardin, 1841

= Oxyrrhis marina =

Species of single-celled organism

Oxyrrhis marina is a species of heterotrophic dinoflagellate with flagella that is widely distributed in the world's oceans.

== Description ==
This species has an asymmetrical oval shape to its single-celled body. It has been likened to a rugby ball. The cell usually measures between 20 and 30 micrometers, but it is known to reach 60. It has two flagella with a protruding, tentacle-like bulge between them. The flagella are covered in scales. Most individuals have scales on the body surface, as well. The two flagella have separate functions. One undulates in waves and the other is coiled, producing a corkscrew-like propulsion to move the cell. The individual appears colorless, but a concentrated culture of cells may have a pink tinge.

== Distribution and habitat ==
The species is thought to have a global distribution except for the polar seas, where it is likely absent or rare, though few samples have been taken of these waters. There are specific records from waters near Europe, North America, Asia, New Zealand, the Canary Islands, Hawaii, and the Azores. It has been found in isolated inland waters, as well, such as a lake in Ukraine. It is less common in the open waters of the oceans. There is a question as to how it came to inhabit so many islands if it is apparently rare in the open ocean. It may have been slowly dispersed on the currents, carried in mats of algae, or transported by humans when shipping arose.

It is most common in the intertidal zone and other coastal regions, where it is a member of the plankton. Habitat types include tide pools and estuaries. It was first described from a salt marsh. It tolerates wide ranges in salinity, temperature, and pH.

== Biology ==
It is heterotrophic, obtaining nutrients externally instead of synthesizing them by an internal process such as photosynthesis. It is an omnivorous grazer, consuming various types of tiny organisms from its environment. It eats phytoplankton such as minute algaes. It has been observed eating Nannochloris oculata and Micromonas pusilla, other flagellates such as Goniomonas amphinema, Pfiesteria piscicida, and Stoeckeria algicida, and some bacteria. It often eats the coccolithophore Cricosphaera elongata, and, in experimental situations, readily eats Tetraselmis suecica, Isochrysis galbana, and Rhodomonas sp. Some of these food items are relatively large, as large as the O. marina cell itself. It is selective in its grazing, showing clear preferences for certain food taxa. It can also pick certain individuals over others, as evidenced by its preference for virus-infected Emiliana huxleyi cells over healthy cells. It is cannibalistic, as well. It feeds by phagocytosis, totally engulfing its prey. It has been observed spinning one of its flagella in such a way that it creates a current, pulling the item closer so it can seize it. It is also raptorial, approaching and pouncing on the prey item, especially when the item is a protist. O. marina can sense and respond to certain chemicals that are exuded by algal prey.

The locomotion of the O. marina cell is helical due to the simultaneous movement of its two flagella. It mostly swims in a straight line, but it makes turns when it detects food.

In terms of reproduction, O. marina is isogamous, with reproductive cells smaller than the body cell, but very little is known about these.

This species sometimes forms red tides, but will also feed on the raphidophyte, Heterosigma akashiwo, another organism responsible for red tides. Its blooms when forming red tides are likely stimulated by environmental factors, such as drops in salinity or increases in prey abundance. O. marina may also affect the environment by producing dimethyl sulfide, which is released when it grazes on some prey types, such as E. huxleyi.

Predators of O. marina include protozoa such as the ciliate Strombidinopsis jeokjo, copepods such as Acartia tonsa and rotifers. The mixotrophic flagellate Prymnesium parvum is a prey item for O. marina when the former is nutrient-replete, but can become a predator when it is nutrient-stressed It has been used as food for fish larvae, including those of black porgy (Mylio macrocephalus), lemonpeel angelfish (Centropyge flavissima), and grey mullet (Mugil cephalus). Bryozoans have been grown on a mixture of the protist and yeast.

== Research ==
This protist has been studied extensively. It is a model organism for the study of many aspects of protist biology, including feeding behavior, physiology, ecology, growth, trophic position, evolution, genomics, and biogeography. Many more studies of its genetics are now underway. There are some limitations to using the species as a model, in part because dinoflagellates are so diverse. O. marina itself is very diverse, with many varied strains, and their biology is influenced by the environment, so it can be hard to find a representative specimen to use as a model. In fact, some experts deny that it is a dinoflagellate at all, or at least a "true" dinoflagellate. In general, it is still very useful for scientific experiments, and researchers recommend it.

O. marina has genes that have evidently been transferred to it from bacteria. It also has some genes that are related to plastids, indicating that it may have had an ancestor that could perform photosynthesis. Also, it has some genes related to essential amino acid synthesis, something that is uncommon in heterotrophs, as they usually obtain essential amino acids by eating them.

It is easy to isolate from the environment and easy to grow in the laboratory. Cultures are fed Dunaliella primolecta or any of a number of other readily available protists. Dead E. coli cells can also be used for food. It can also be sustained on a nutritional medium. Cultures can be maintained for years.

== Taxonomy ==
This protist has been called a morphospecies. As it is now understood, it is composed of a number of isolates, some of which are quite distinct. There are 50 to 80 wild isolates. In the future some of these could be divided into separate taxa, perhaps on the species level. One of these may become Oxyrrhis maritima. Another called O. tenticulifera may be valid, as well.
