= Carnivorous fungus =

Fungus which traps and eats tiny animals

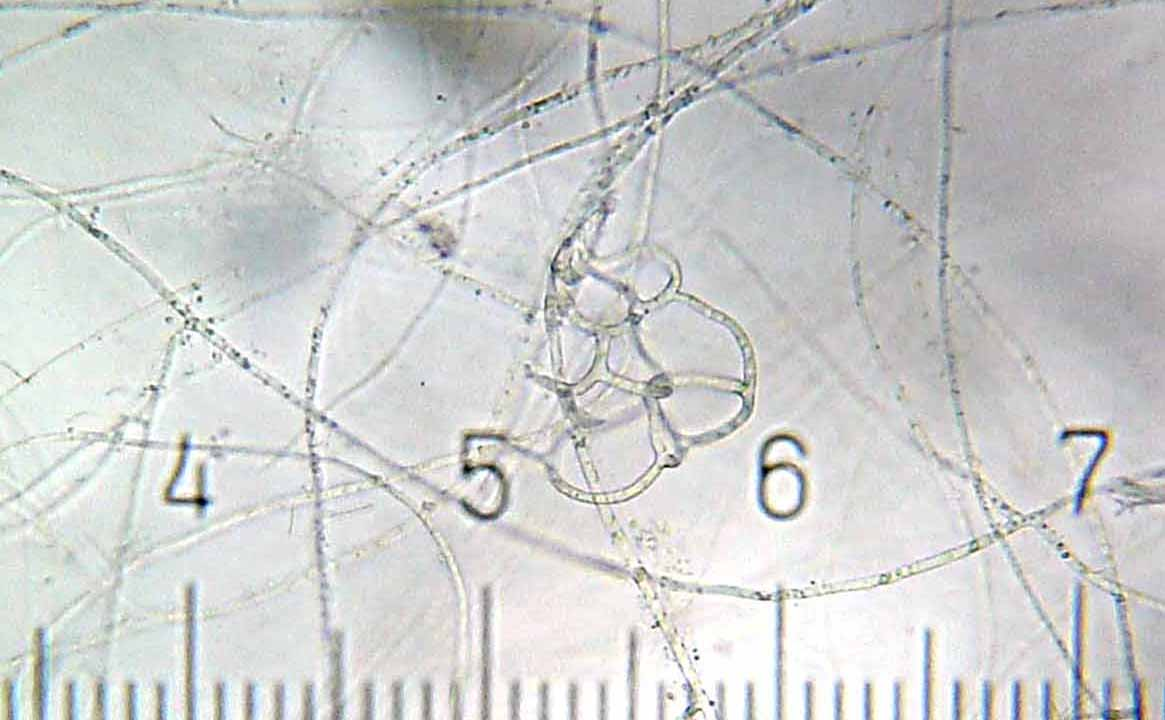
A fungus of the genus Arthrobotrys, showing adhesive nets which it uses to trap nematodes. Numbered ticks are 122 μm apart.

A carnivorous fungus or predaceous fungus is a fungus that derives some or most of its nutrients from trapping and eating microscopic or other minute animals. More than 200 species have been described, belonging to the phyla Ascomycota, Mucoromycotina, and Basidiomycota. They usually live in soil and many species trap or stun nematodes (nematophagous fungus), while others attack amoebae or collembola.

Fungi that grow on the epidermis, hair, skin, nails, scales or feathers of living or dead animals are considered to be dermatophytes rather than carnivores. Similarly, fungi in orifices and the digestive tract of animals are not carnivorous, and neither are internal pathogens. Neither are insect pathogens that stun and colonize insects normally labelled carnivorous if the fungal thallus is mainly in the insect as does Cordyceps, or if it clings to the insect like the Laboulbeniales. All of these are examples of parasitism or scavenging.

Two basic trapping mechanisms have been observed in carnivorous fungi that are predatory on nematodes:

- constricting rings (active traps)
- adhesive structures (passive traps)

Sequencing of ribosomal DNA has shown that these trap types occur in separate fungus lineages, an example of convergent evolution.

== See also ==
- Carnivorous plant
- Predatory dinoflagellate
- Protocarnivorous plant
