= Luciella masanensis =

Scientific classification
- Domain: Eukaryota
- Clade: Sar
- Clade: Alveolata
- Phylum: Dinoflagellata
- Class: Dinophyceae
- Order: Thoracosphaerales
- Family: Pfiesteriaceae
- Genus: Luciella
- Species: L. masanensis

Binomial name
- Luciella masanensis P.L.Mason, Jeong, Litaker, Reece & Steidinger, 2007

Species of single-celled organism

Luciella masanensis is a species of heterotrophic marine dinoflagellates.
