= Sea Change (Powlik novel) =

1999 novel by James Powlik

- First edition cover
- Author: James Powlik
- Language: English
- Genre: Science fiction; Thriller; Suspense
- Publisher: Island Books
- Publication date: August 17, 1999
- Pages: 496
- ISBN: 0-385-33399-4

Sea Change is a 1999 novel by oceanographer James Powlik. It is an environmental thriller about a harmful algal bloom.
