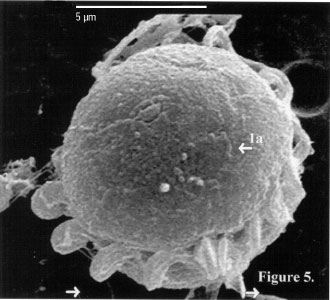
- Pseudopfiesteria shumwayae SEM micrograph

Scientific classification
- Domain: Eukaryota
- Supergroup: Alveolata
- Division: Dinoflagellata
- Class: Dinophyceae
- Order: Thoracosphaerales
- Family: Pfiesteriaceae
- Genus: Pseudopfiesteria
- Species: P. shumwayae

Binomial name
- Pseudopfiesteria shumwayae Glasgow & Burkholder

= Pseudopfiesteria shumwayae =

Species of single-celled organism

Pseudopfiesteria shumwayae (formerly placed in the genus Pfiesteria; see 'Taxonomy' section below) is a species of heterotrophic dinoflagellates in the genus Pseudopfiesteria. It was first characterized in North Carolina in 2000. It can acquire the ability for photosynthesis through eating green algae and retaining their chloroplasts. It can also turn predatory and toxic. Strains of Pseudopfiesteria shumwayae have been implicated in fish kills around the US east coast. Pseudopfiesteria shumwayae has been described as having a less complex life cycle than Pfiesteria piscicida.

== Toxicity ==
While toxic strains of Pseudopfiesteria shumwayae have been implicated in fish kills, its ability to secrete an exotoxin to kill its prey has been subject to controversy. A study published in 2002 has shown that it is capable of killing fish by direct contact and feeding on their skin through micropredation. Toxicity levels appear to depend on the strains and assays used in the laboratory. Pfiesteria shumwayae toxin present in filtered water can cause cognitive deficits in rats.

== Taxonomy ==
Based on 2005 research, the organism previously known as Pfiesteria shumwayae should be reassigned its own genus, based on both morphological analysis and molecular evidence as supported by rDNA analysis. Although closely resembling Pfiesteria piscicida, it differs in two important precingular plates 5" and 6", which historically, only one plate difference would be sufficient to place in a separate genus. The species ' shumwayae ' has thus been categorized in a more recently erected genus, Pseudopfiesteria.

== Occurrence ==
Pfiesteria has a worldwide distribution and is typically found in estuaries and coastal habitats. It is usually benign unless it "blooms" to a high concentration. High concentrations of Pseudopfiesteria shumwayae have been found in the following locations:

- Taskinas Creek, a tributary of the York River in James City County, Virginia, in March 2005.
