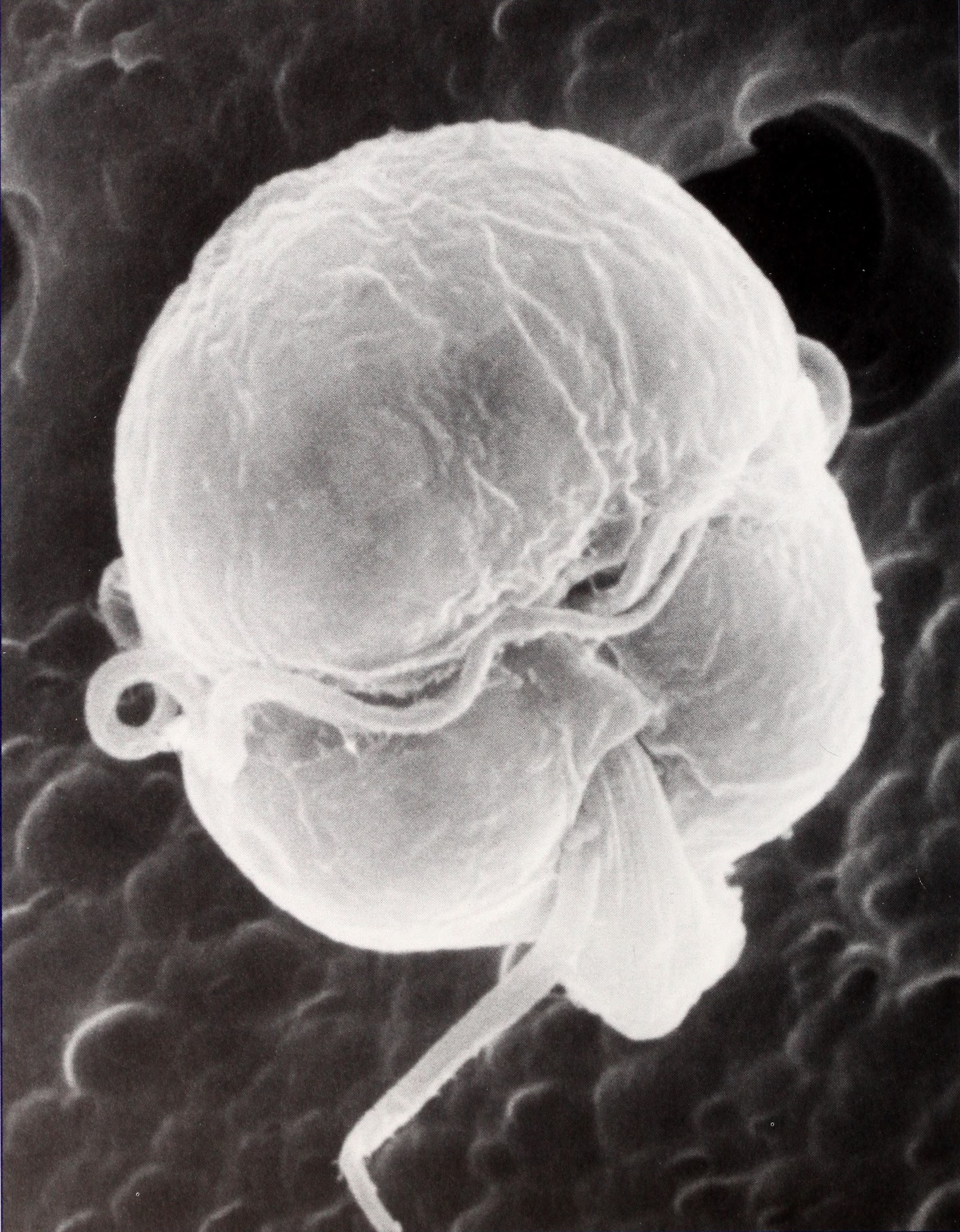

Scientific classification
- Domain: Eukaryota
- Supergroup: Alveolata
- Division: Dinoflagellata
- Class: Dinophyceae
- Order: Thoracosphaerales
- Family: Pfiesteriaceae
- Genus: Pfiesteria
- Species: P. piscicida

Binomial name
- Pfiesteria piscicida Steidinger & Burkholder

= Pfiesteria piscicida =

Toxic dinoflagellate species

Pfiesteria piscicida is a dinoflagellate species of the genus Pfiesteria that some researchers claim was responsible for many harmful algal blooms in the 1980s and 1990s on the coast of North Carolina and Maryland. North Carolinian media in the 1990s referred to the organism as the cell from hell. It is known to populate estuaries. Piscicida means "fish-killer".

== Life cycles ==
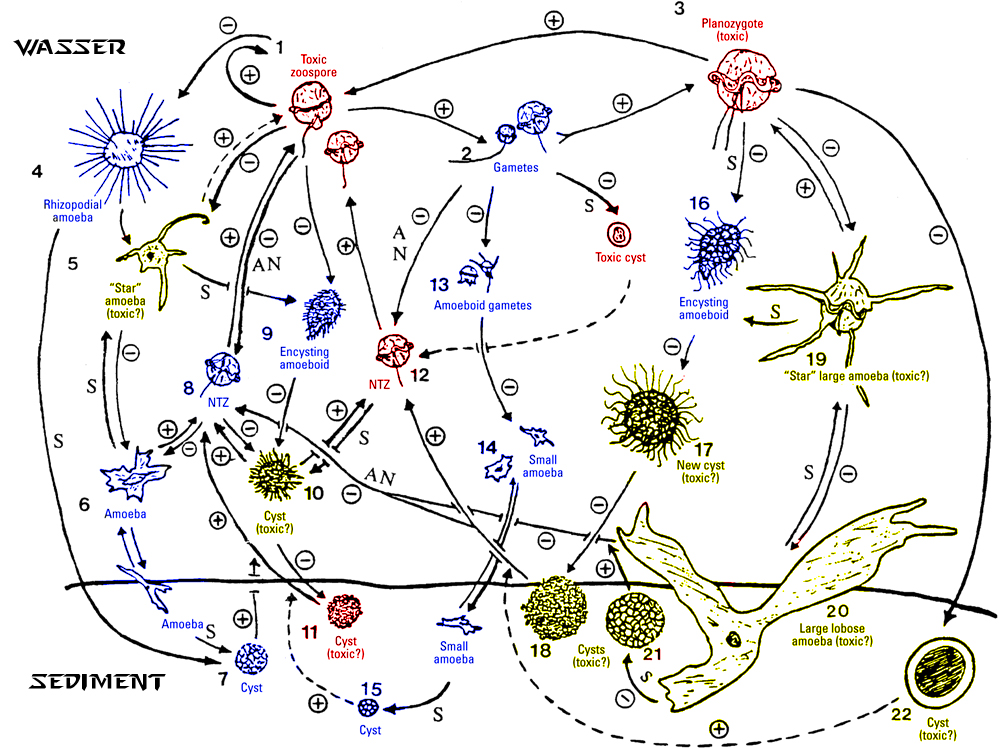
The complex life cycle of Pfiesteria piscidica. Red = toxic stages, yellow = possibly toxic stages, blue = passive stages

Early research suggested a very complex life cycle of Pfiesteria piscicida with up to 24 different stages, spanning from cyst to several amoeboid forms with toxic zoospores. Transformations from one stage to another depend on environmental conditions such as the availability of food. However these results have become controversial as additional research has found only a simple haplontic life cycle with no toxic amoeboid stages and amoebae present on attacked fish may represent an unrelated species of protist.

== Toxicity ==
Pfiesteria presumably kills fish via releasing a toxin into the water to paralyze its prey. This hypothesis has been questioned as no toxin could be isolated and no toxicity was observed in some experiments. However, toxicity appears to depend on the strains and assays used. Polymerase chain reaction-analyses suggested that the organism lacks the DNA for polyketide synthesis, the type of toxins associated with most toxic dinoflagellates. Researchers from the NOAA National Centers for Coastal Ocean Science, the National Institute of Standards and Technology, the Medical University of South Carolina, and the College of Charleston (S.C.) have formally isolated and characterized the toxin in the estuarine dinoflagellate Pfiesteria piscicida as a metal complex and free radical toxin and also have identified how the organism transforms from a non-toxic to toxic state.

== Human illness ==
Very little research on the human health effects of Pfiesteria toxins has been conducted. At a multi-state workshop at the Centers for Disease Control and Prevention (CDC) in Atlanta, U.S., at the end of September 1997, attendees agreed on clinical symptoms that characterize a new illness associated with Pfiesteria exposure. These clinical features include:

- memory loss
- confusion
- acute skin burning (on direct contact with water); or
- three or more of an additional set of conditions (headaches, skin rash, eye irritation, upper respiratory irritation, muscle cramps, and gastrointestinal complaints (i.e., nausea, vomiting, diarrhea, and/or abdominal cramps).

With these criteria and environmental qualifiers (e.g., 22% of a 50-fish sample, all of the same species, have lesions caused by a toxin), it is likely that Pfiesteria-related surveillance data can better track potential illnesses.

Pfiesteria toxins have been blamed for illness in those who have come in close contact with waters where this organism is abundant. Since June 1997, the Maryland Department of Health and Hygiene has been collecting data from Maryland physicians through a statewide surveillance system on illnesses suspected of being caused by Pfiesteria toxin. As of late October 1997, illness was reported by 146 persons who had been exposed to diseased fish or to waters that were the site of suspected Pfiesteria activity. Many of these persons are watermen and commercial fishermen.

The strongest evidence of Pfiesteria-associated human illness so far comes from case studies of two research scientists who were both overcome in their North Carolina laboratory in 1993. They still complain of adverse effects on their cognitive abilities, particularly after exercising. Duke University Medical Center researchers conducted experiments on rats, which showed that the toxin appeared to slow learning but did not affect memory.

Treatment with Colestyramine shortly after exposure has been shown to alleviate symptoms.
