= Toyota AE86 =

Toyota Corolla Levin; Sprinter Trueno (AE86)
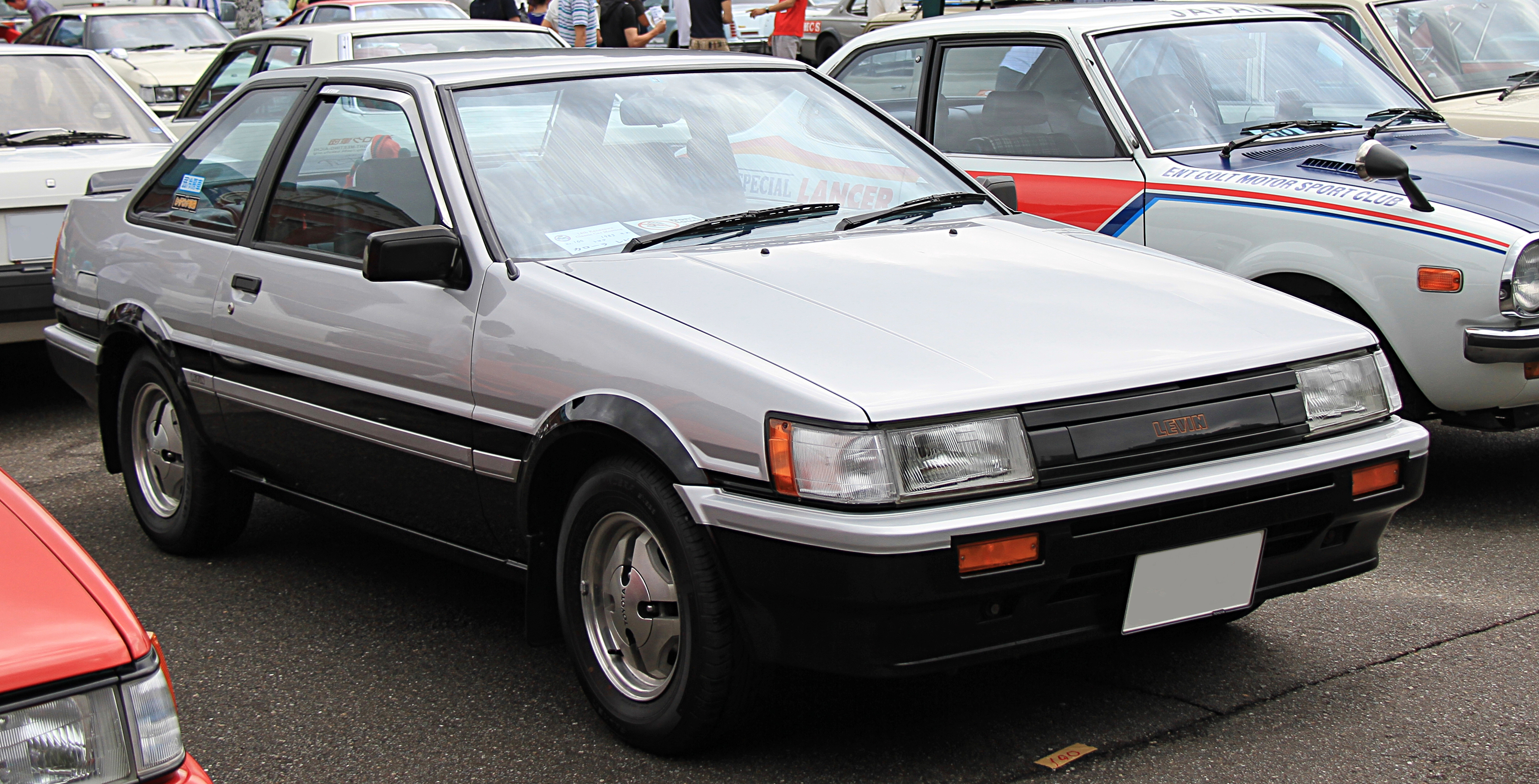
- 1983 Toyota Corolla Levin GT APEX coupé

Overview
- Manufacturer: Toyota
- Model code: AE86
- Production: May 1983– July 1987
- Model years: 1984–1987
- Assembly: Japan: Toyota City (Takaoka plant); Japan: Higashi-Fuji plant, Susono, Shizuoka (Kanto Auto Works)
- Designer: Fumio Agetsuma

Body and chassis
- Class: Sport compact (C); Sports car (S)
- Body style: 2-door coupé; 2-door convertible (dealer optional); 3-door liftback
- Layout: Front-engine, rear-wheel drive
- Platform: E70
- Related: Toyota AE85; Toyota Corolla (E70); Toyota Sprinter (E70); Daihatsu Charmant (A60)

Powertrain
- Engine: 1.6 L 4A/4A-C I4 SOHC; 1.6 L 4A-GE/GEC/GEU I4 DOHC
- Transmission: T50 5-speed manual; A42DL 4-speed automatic; A44DE 4-speed automatic

Dimensions
- Wheelbase: 2,400 mm (94 in)
- Length: Corolla Levin: 4,185 mm (165 in) (1983–1985); 4,200 mm (165 in) (1985–1987); Sprinter Trueno: 4,205 mm (166 in) (1983–1985); 4,215 mm (166 in) (1985–1987); North America/Middle East: 4,285 mm (169 in)
- Width: 1,625 mm (64 in)
- Height: 1,335 mm (53 in)
- Curb weight: 900–1,065 kg (1,984–2,348 lb)

Chronology
- Predecessor: Toyota Corolla Levin/Sprinter Trueno TE71
- Successor: Toyota Corolla Levin/Sprinter Trueno AE92

The AE86 series of the Toyota Corolla Levin/Sprinter Trueno are small, front-engine/rear-wheel-drive compact cars within the mostly front-engine/front-wheel-drive fifth generation Corolla (E80) range—marketed and manufactured by Toyota from 1983 to 1987 in coupé and liftback configurations. It was the last production Corolla to feature rear-wheel drive.

The cars were light, affordable, easily modifiable, and had a five-speed manual transmission, a limited-slip differential (optional), MacPherson strut front suspension, near 50/50 front/rear weight balance, and a front-engine/rear-drive layout—at a time when this configuration was waning industry-wide. In certain areas of the world (and optional in others) it was powered by a high revving (7800 rpm) twin-cam engine.

Widely popular for Showroom Stock, Group A, and Group N, Rally and Club racing, the cars' inherent qualities also earned the AE86 an early and enduring international prominence in the motorsport discipline of drifting. The AE86 was featured centrally in the popular, long-running Japanese manga and anime series titled Initial D (1995–2013) as the main character's drift and tofu delivery car. In 2015, Road & Track called the AE86 "a cult icon, inextricably interwoven with the earliest days of drifting."

The AE86 would go on to inspire the Toyota 86 (2012–present), a 2+2 sports car jointly developed by Toyota and Subaru, manufactured by Subaru—and marketed also as the Toyota GT86, Toyota GR86, Toyota FT86, Scion FR-S and Subaru BRZ.

In November 2021, Toyota temporarily restarted the production of a limited number of parts for the AE86, with dealers beginning to take orders for new steering knuckle arms and rear brake calipers. Rear axle half shafts have also been scheduled for new production. Toyota has also announced that this reboot is temporary, and parts will only be available as long as stocks last.

== Name ==
The nameplate Trueno derives from the Spanish word for thunder, and Levin derives from the Middle English for lightning. In Japan, the car is known colloquially as “Hachi-Roku” (ハチロク), meaning “Eight-Six” in Japanese, which is also used by AE86 enthusiasts outside Japan.

The chassis code "AE86" is used to describe the 1.6 L RWD model of the E80 Corolla. The "A" represents the engine series that powered the car (Toyota A engine - 1.6 L 4A engines), "E8" represents the generation (E80 series Corolla) and "6" represents the variation within this generation (depending on the engine, drive layout or suspension choice, AE85 is also RWD model but powered by the smaller 1.5 L 3A-U engine, while AE82 is FWD model powered by the same 1.6 L 4A engines).

Bracketing a minor external facelift, models marketed between 1983 and 1985 are called "zenki" (前期, lit. 'early period'), and those marketed from 1986 to 1987 are called "kouki" (後期, lit. 'latter period').

== Technicals ==
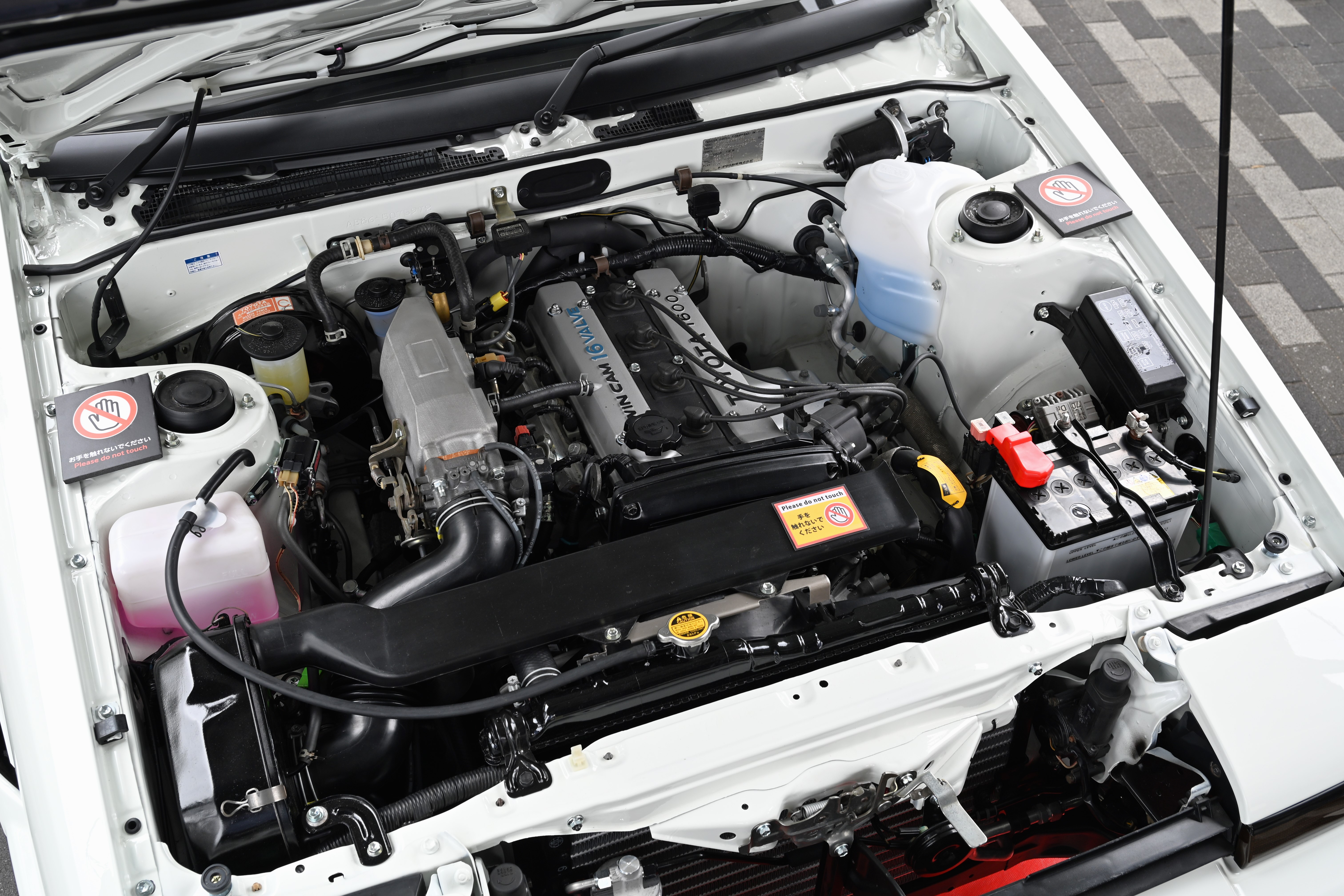
DOHC 4A-GEU "blue top" engine

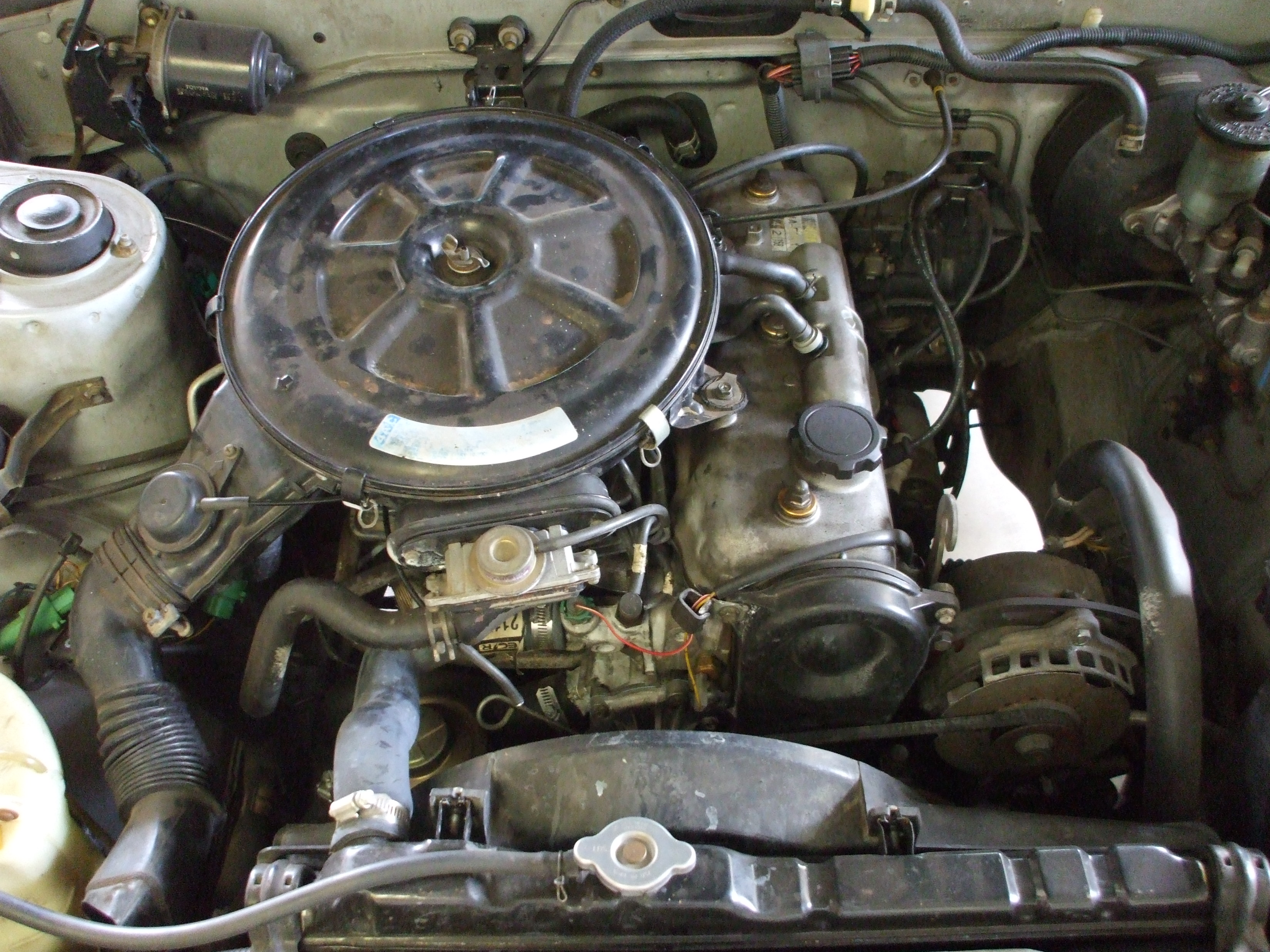
SOHC 4A-C engine

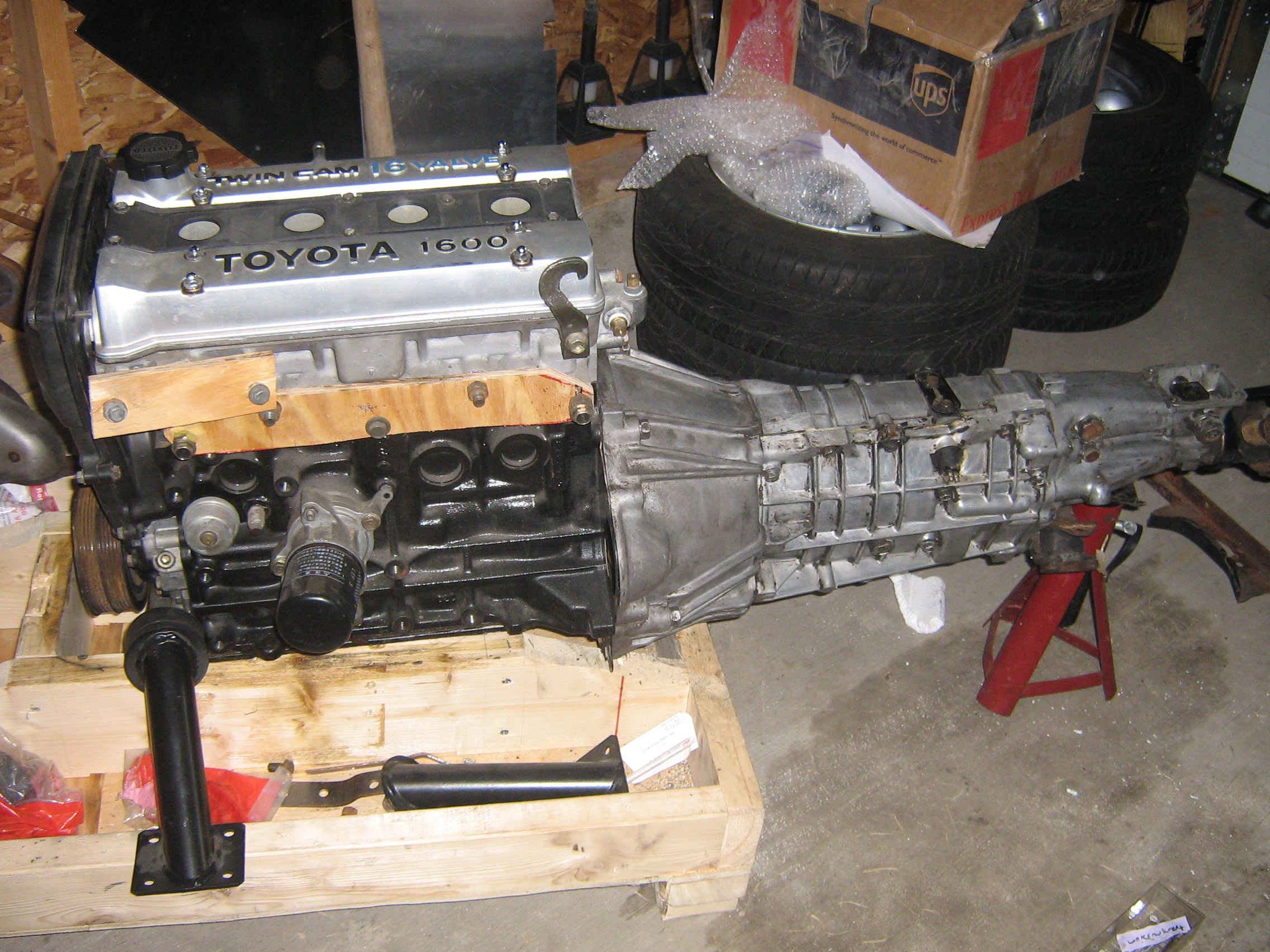
4A-GE engine and T50 5-speed manual gearbox

The Japanese market AE86 was only available with a naturally aspirated 4A-GEU "blue top" 1,587 cc (1.6 L; 96.8 cu in) inline-four engine, a DOHC four-valve-per-cylinder engine, which was also used in MR2 G Limited (AW11), Corona GT (AT141), Celica 1600GT-R (AA63) and Carina 1600GTR (AA63) with a compression ratio of 9.4:1. It had a maximum gross output of 130 PS (128 hp; 96 kW) and 149 N⋅m (110 lb⋅ft) of torque in standard form, The 4A-GEU engines used in the Japanese market AE86 were also equipped with Denso electronic port fuel injection, T-VIS variable intake geometry and a manifold absolute pressure (MAP) sensor.

In North America, a modified 4A-GEC engine was used to comply with California emissions regulations, which uses a mass air flow (MAF) sensor. Power was rated (SAE net) at 112 hp (114 PS; 84 kW) and 97–100 lb⋅ft (132–136 N⋅m) of torque, while the lower SOHC 4A-C was rated at 70–74 hp (71–75 PS; 52–55 kW) and 85–86 lb⋅ft (115–117 N⋅m) of torque. These North American specification engines were also available in Australia (4A-C only), Sweden, Switzerland and West Germany (4A-GEC only, from 1985). However, these engines claimed higher outputs (DIN) at 116–120 PS (114–118 hp; 85–88 kW) and 140 N⋅m (103 lb⋅ft) of torque for the 4A-GEC and 78 PS (77 hp; 57 kW) and 123 N⋅m (91 lb⋅ft) of torque for the 4A-C. For the rest of the word, the regular 4A-GE (with a MAP sensor) and 4A engines without a catalytic converter were offered instead. In Europe and selected general markets (such as Singapore), the twincam engine has a compression ratio of 10.0:1, and is rated at 124 PS (122 hp; 91 kW) and 142 N⋅m (105 lb⋅ft) of torque (DIN).

The AE86 used ventilated disc brakes for the twincam model, while the single cam featured a front solid disc and rear drum brakes. The car was equipped with a MacPherson strut style independent suspension at the front and a four-link live axle with coil springs for the rear as well as stabilizer bars, front and rear, and an optional LSD (twincam with manual only). Depending on the market, the AE86 came with a T50 5-speed manual gearbox and optional A42DL/A44DE 4-speed automatic.

Models equipped with the 4A-GE engine received a 6.7 in (170 mm) T-series rear differential, while 3A-U (only offered on the AE85), 4A and 4A-C models received a smaller, weaker, 6.38 in (162 mm) S-series rear differential.

One of the staff who was behind the car's engineering work was Nobuaki Katayama, who would later head the company's motorsport department and who would become chief engineer of the Altezza project a decade later. He has a photo of an AE86 hung in his office.

== Body styles ==
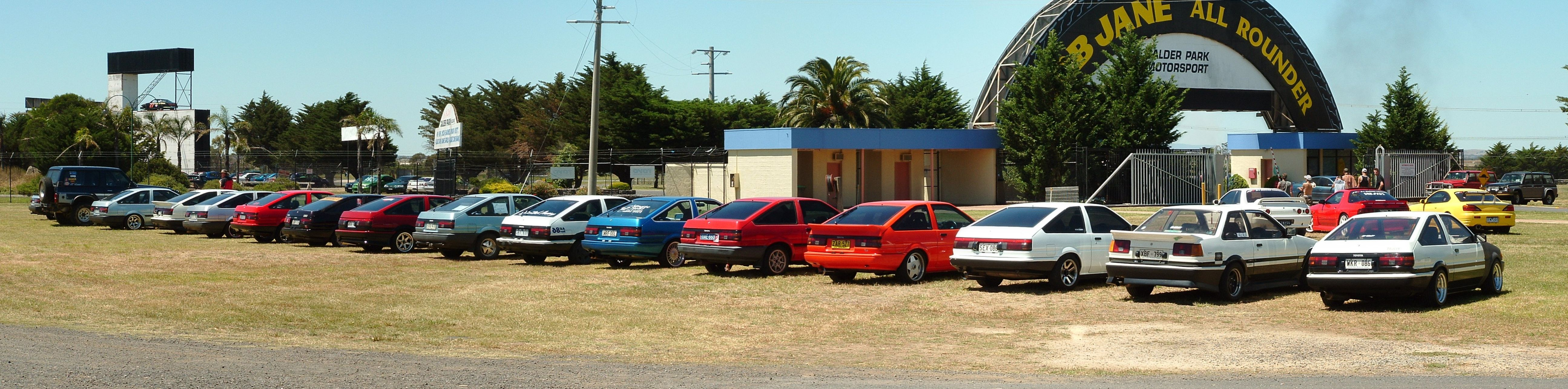

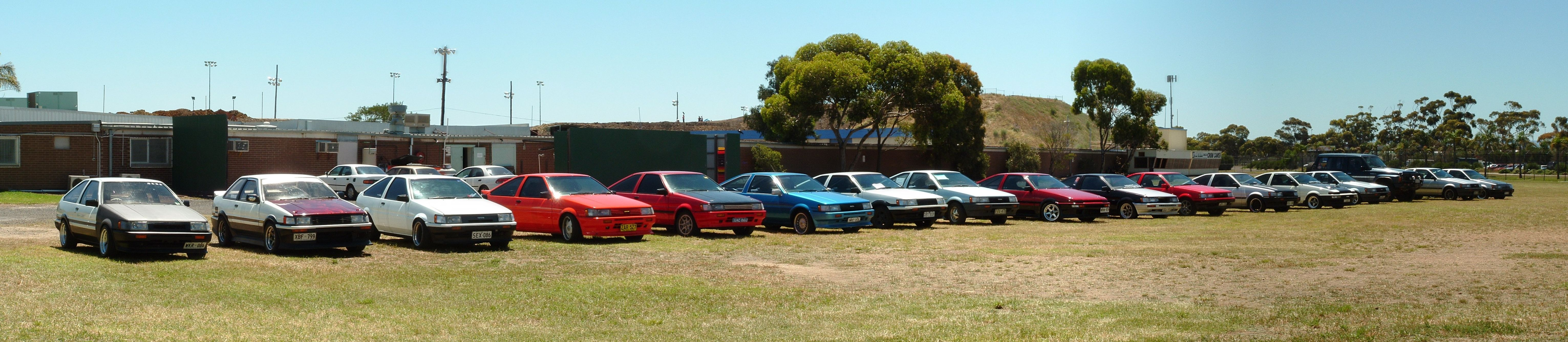
Variety of AE86s at 2004 Hachiroku.com.au Annual AE86 Meet-Up in Melbourne, Australia.

The Levin and Trueno featured fixed-headlights and retractable headlights respectively, with both available as hatchback or coupé. The export model name Corolla applies to both variations. The AE86 (along with the lower spec 1,452 cc (1.5 L; 88.6 cu in) AE85 and 1,587 cc (1.6 L; 96.8 cu in) SR5 and DX versions) was rear wheel drive, built on the rear wheel drive E70 Corolla platform (same wheelbase length, interchangeable parts, etc.), unlike the front wheel drive E80 models in the same range. The liftback claimed a drag coefficient of 0,35 Cd, while the coupé was higher at 0,38 Cd.

=== Pre-facelift (Zenki) ===
The Japanese market AE86 underwent minor changes in September 1983, it now featured different door mirrors, additional gold stripes for the Levin GT APEX thermostatic flip-up grille and revised optional 14-inch alloy wheels that were now in light gold with new center caps. A sports package was also introduced as factory option, which includes aero kit and leather-wrapped steering wheel and gear shift knob.

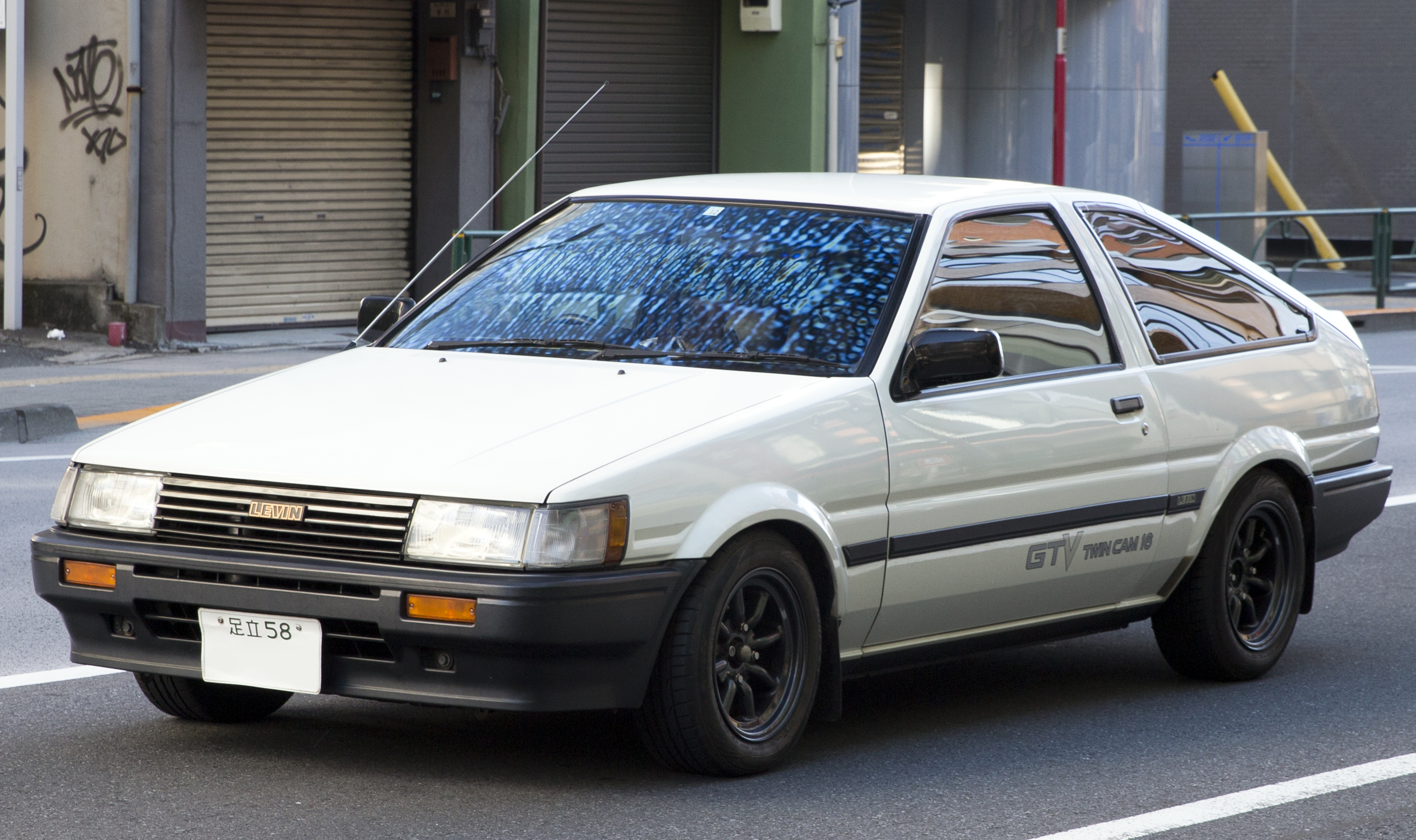
1983–1985 Corolla Levin GTV liftback

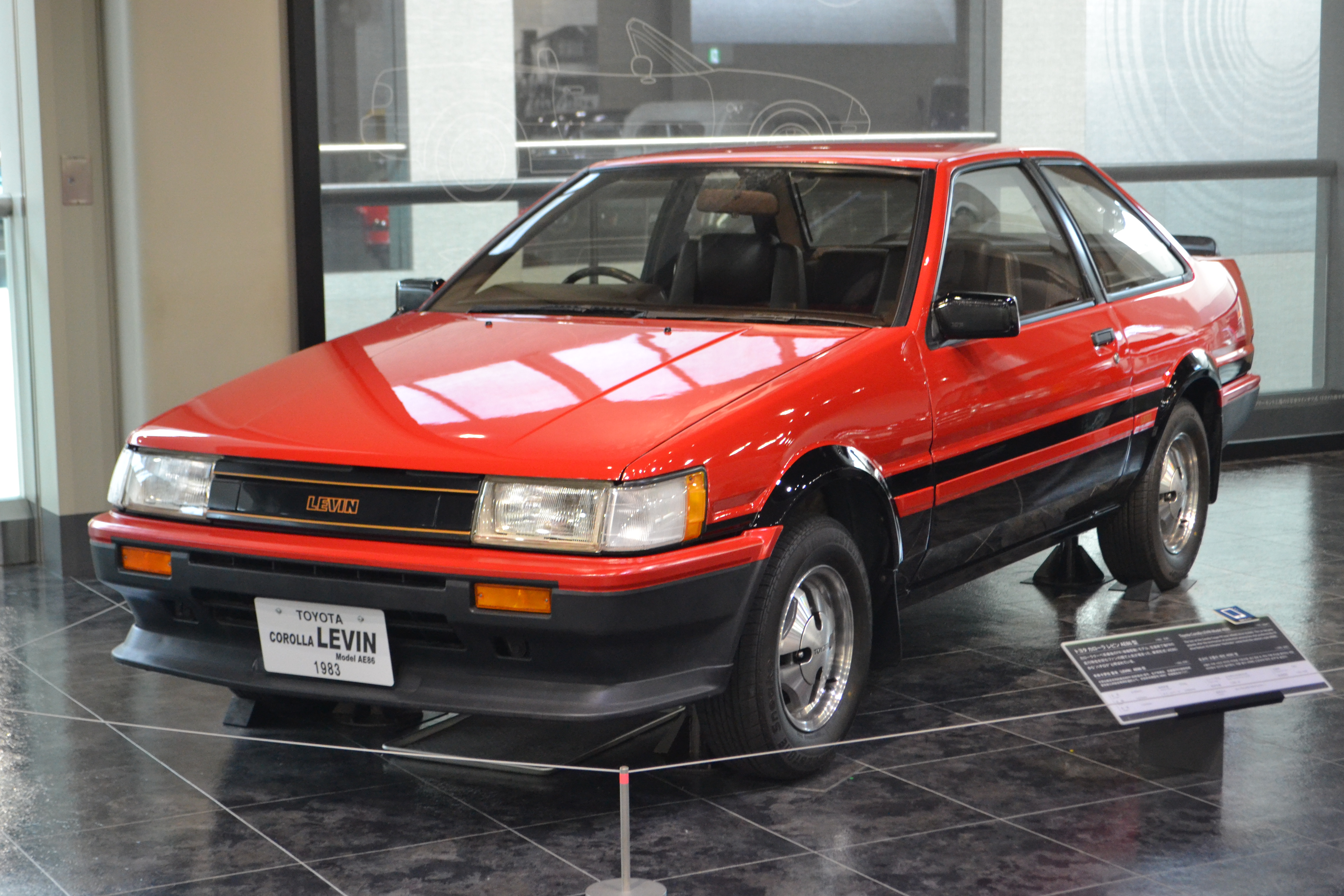
1983–1985 Corolla Levin GT APEX coupé with the thermostatic flip-up grille

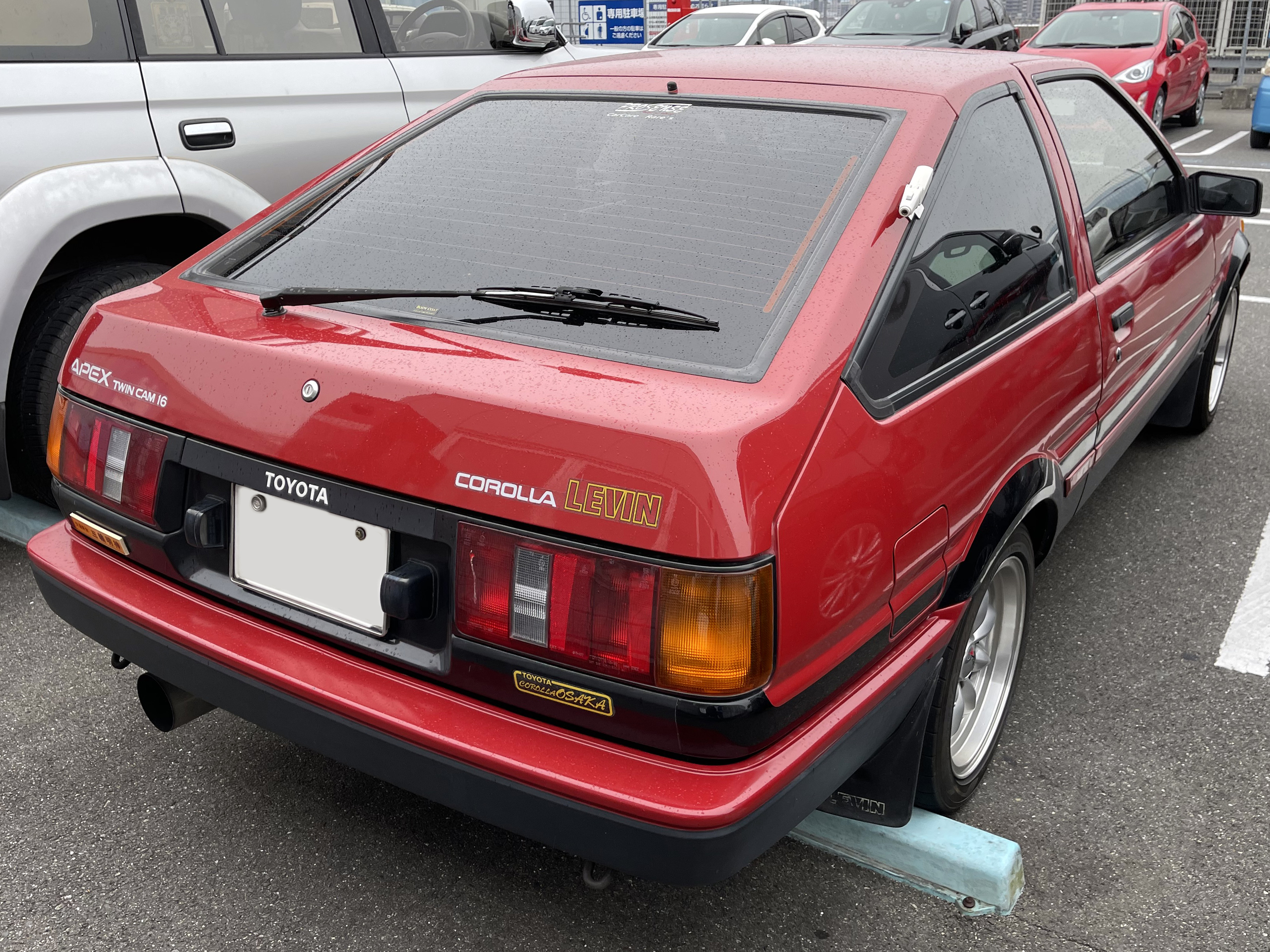
1983–1985 Corolla Levin GT APEX liftback

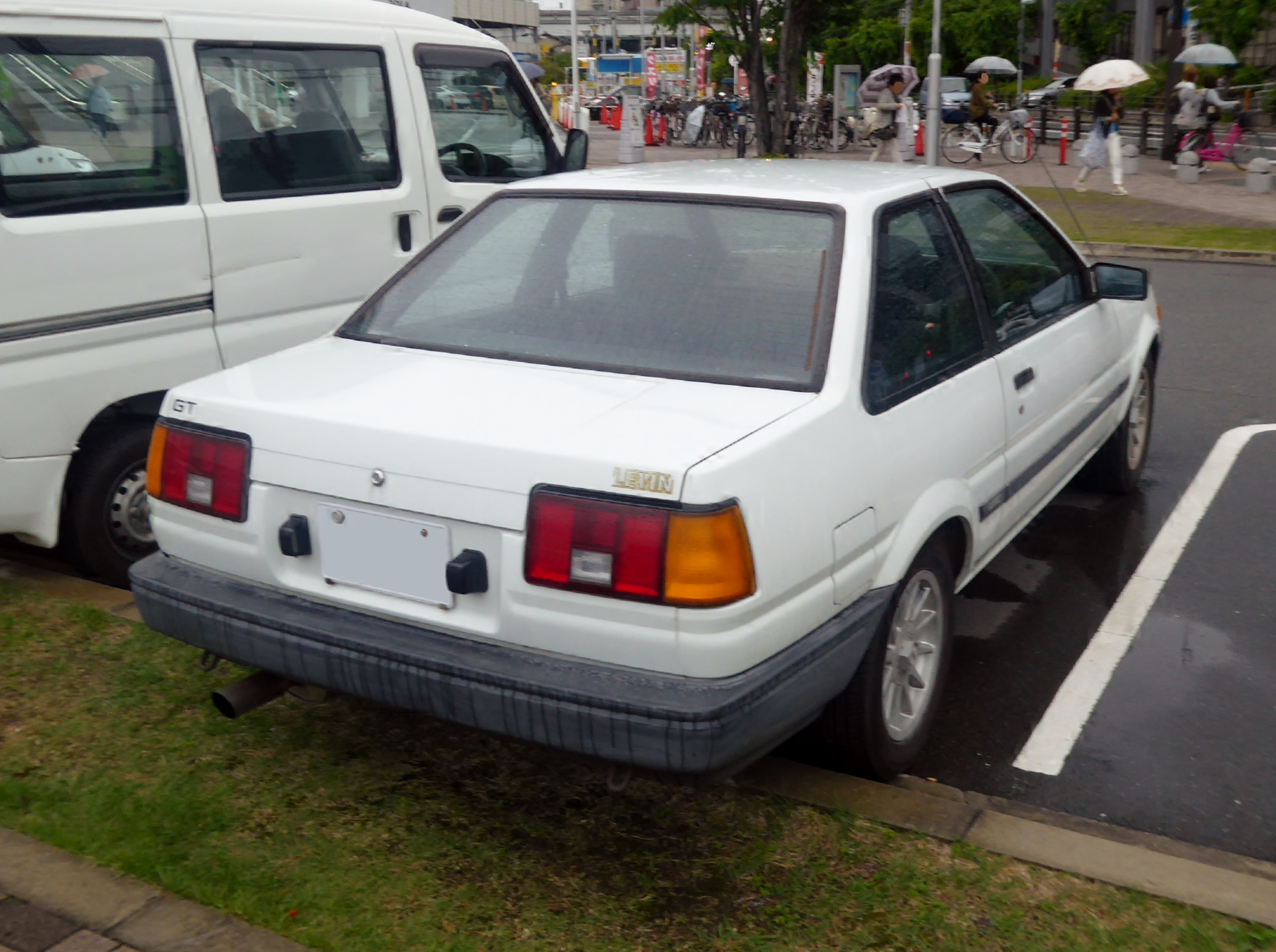
1983–1985 Corolla Levin GT coupé

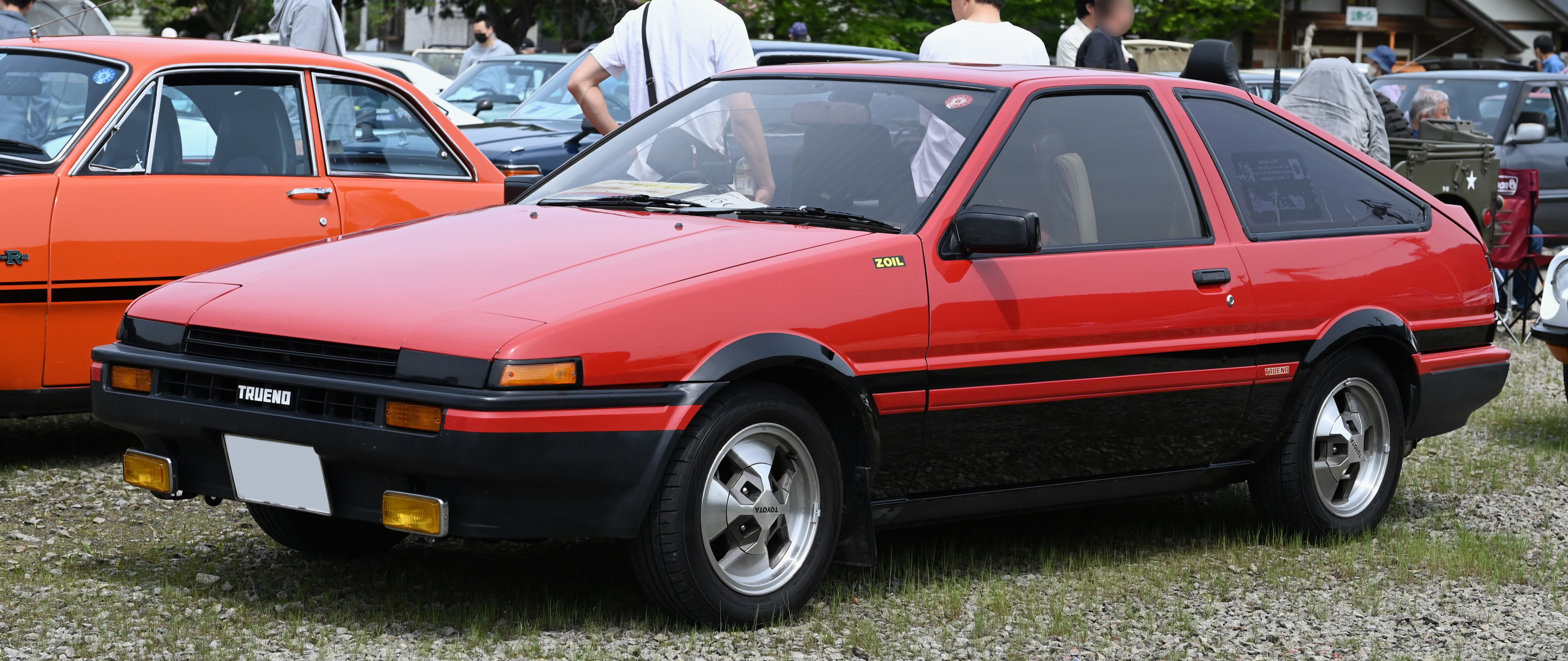
1983–1985 Sprinter Trueno GT APEX liftback

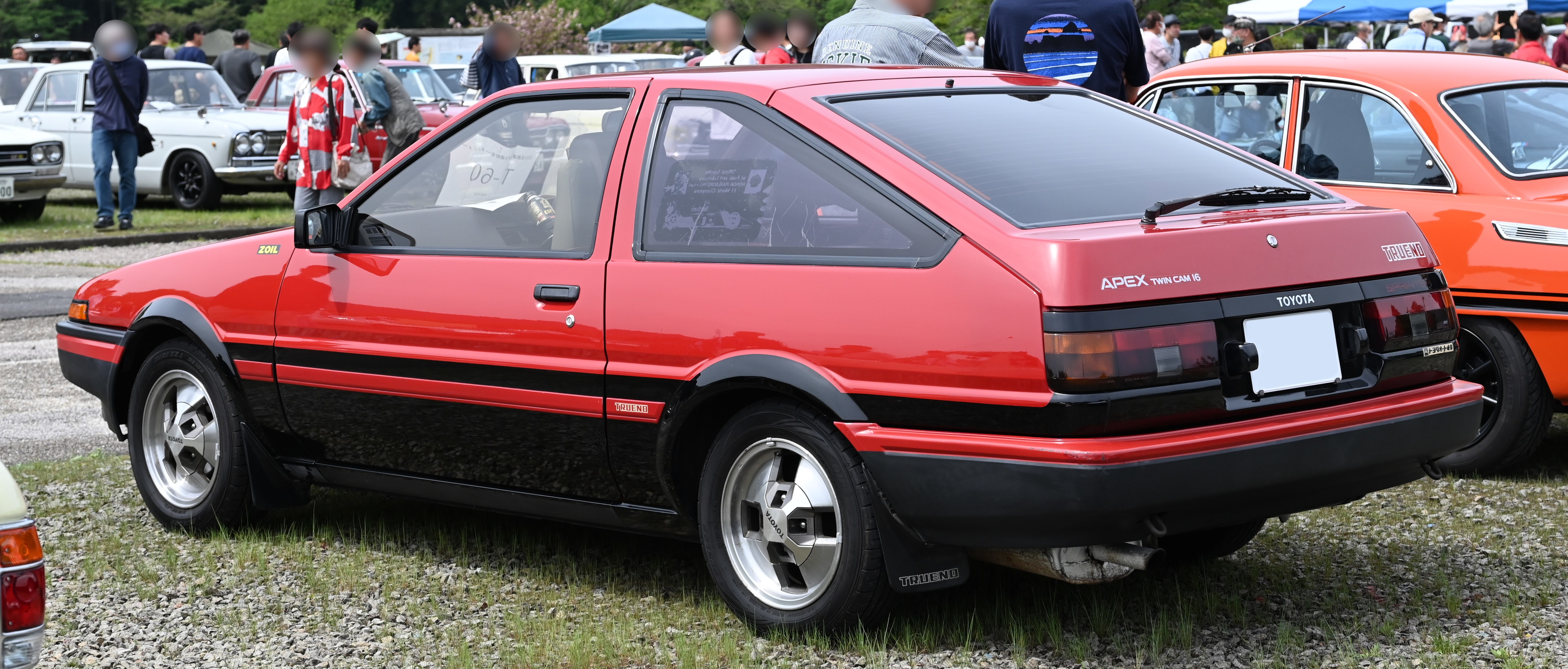
1983–1985 Sprinter Trueno GT APEX liftback

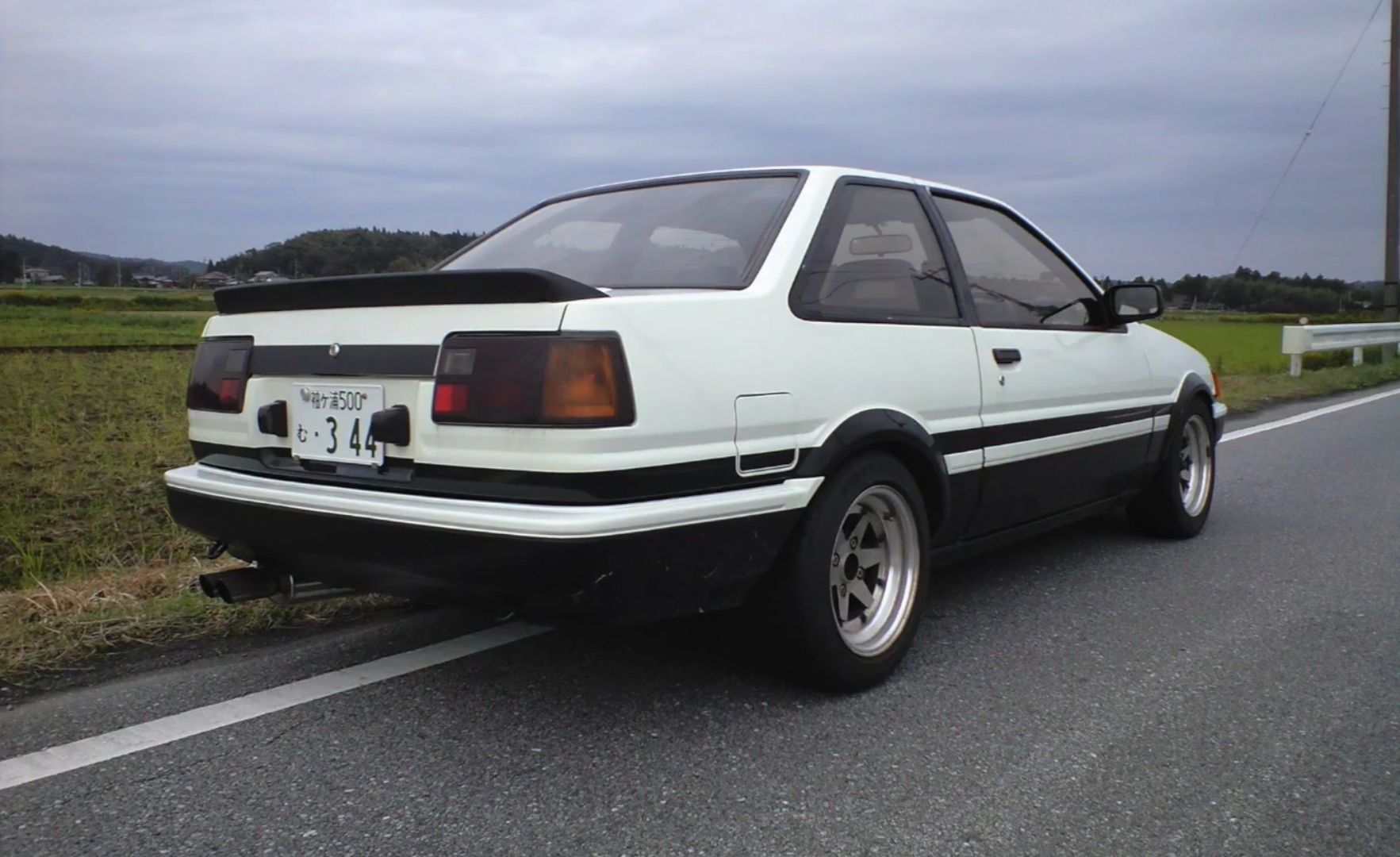
1983–1985 Sprinter Trueno GT APEX coupé

=== Facelift (Kouki) ===
Minor bodywork changes were made in May 1985, which resulted in different taillights, new sets of alloy wheels, updated bumpers with wrap-around front indicators, corner and headlight trim lights, interior, and grilles. New paint colors were shuffled around as well. Both the Levin and Trueno now had halogen lamps as standard. The seats on the GTV and GT APEX models were also redesigned. These were the main differences for both AE85/86 Levin and Trueno coupé and liftback models.

In 1986, Toyota marketed a limited-edition model of the AE86 as the "Black Limited" model. It was advertised as a limited-production model with only 400 units, and was based on the Kouki Sprinter Trueno GT APEX 3-door liftback.

In the early 1987, there was a soft-top convertible version based on the Sprinter Trueno GT APEX coupé sold by a Toyota Auto Store dealer in Tama, Tokyo. Approximately 20 units of this dealer optional model were produced, priced at almost 50% more than the top model Sprinter Trueno.

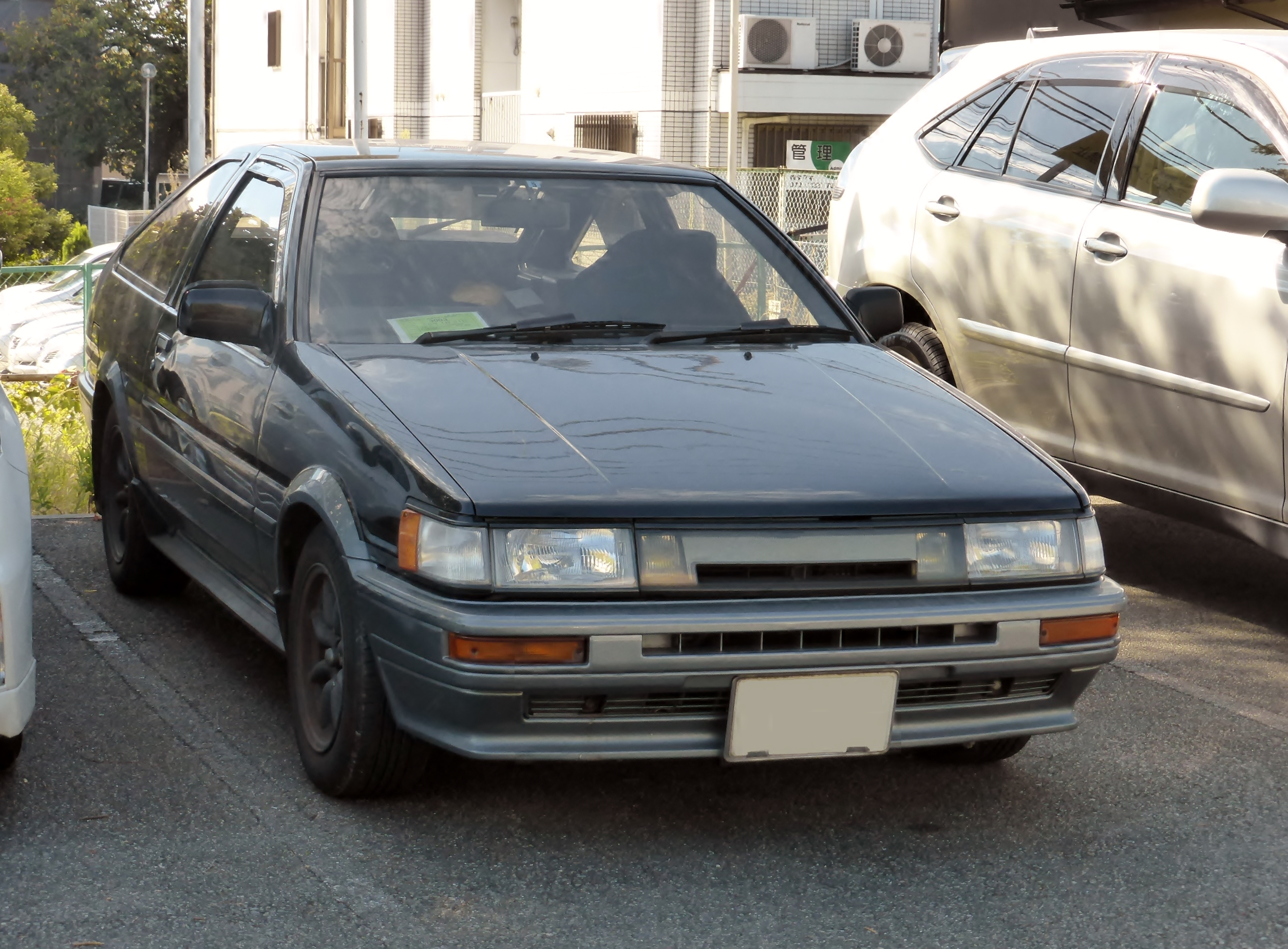
1985–1987 Toyota Corolla Levin GT APEX liftback

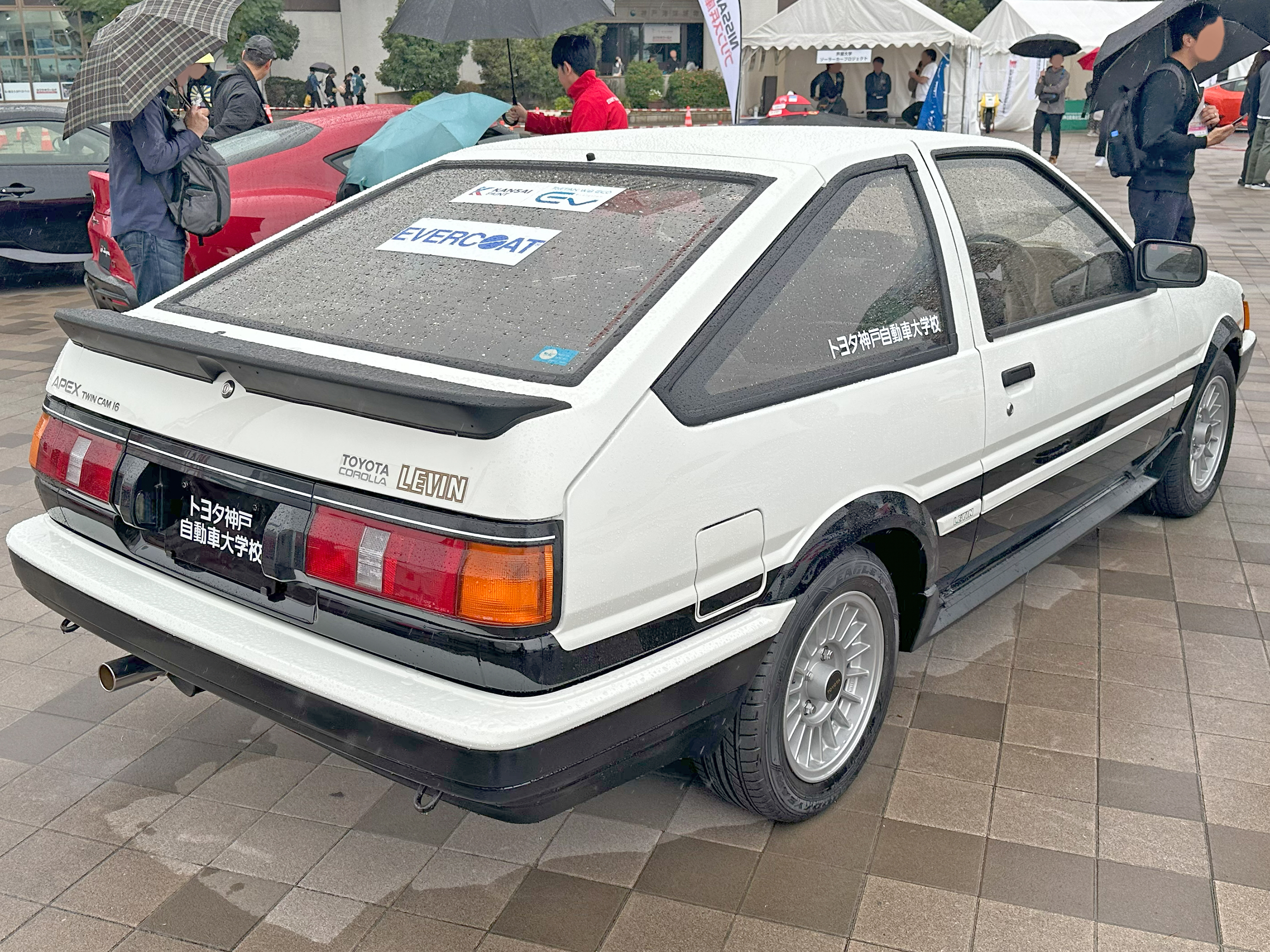
1985–1987 Toyota Corolla Levin GT APEX liftback

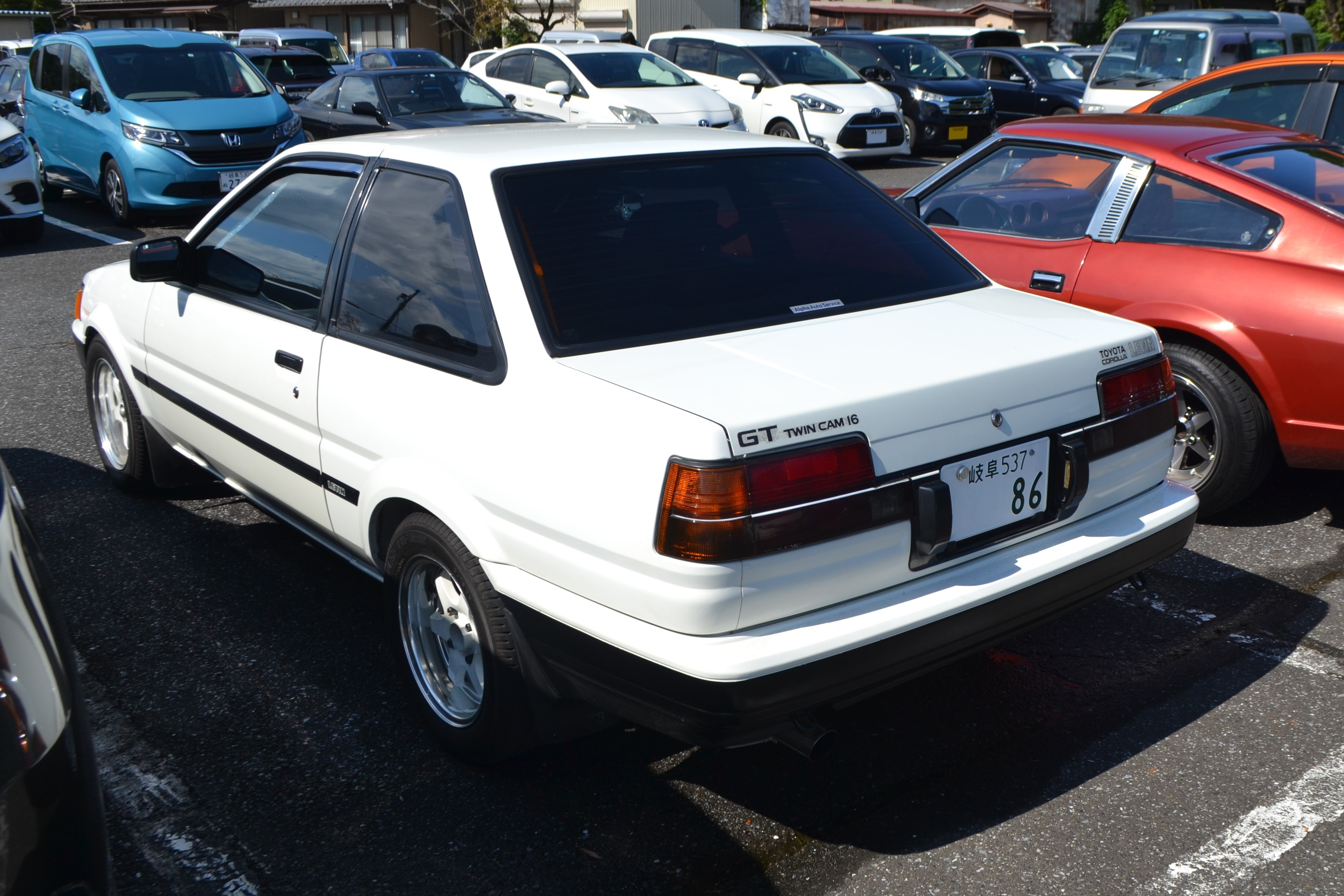
1985–1987 Corolla Levin GT coupé

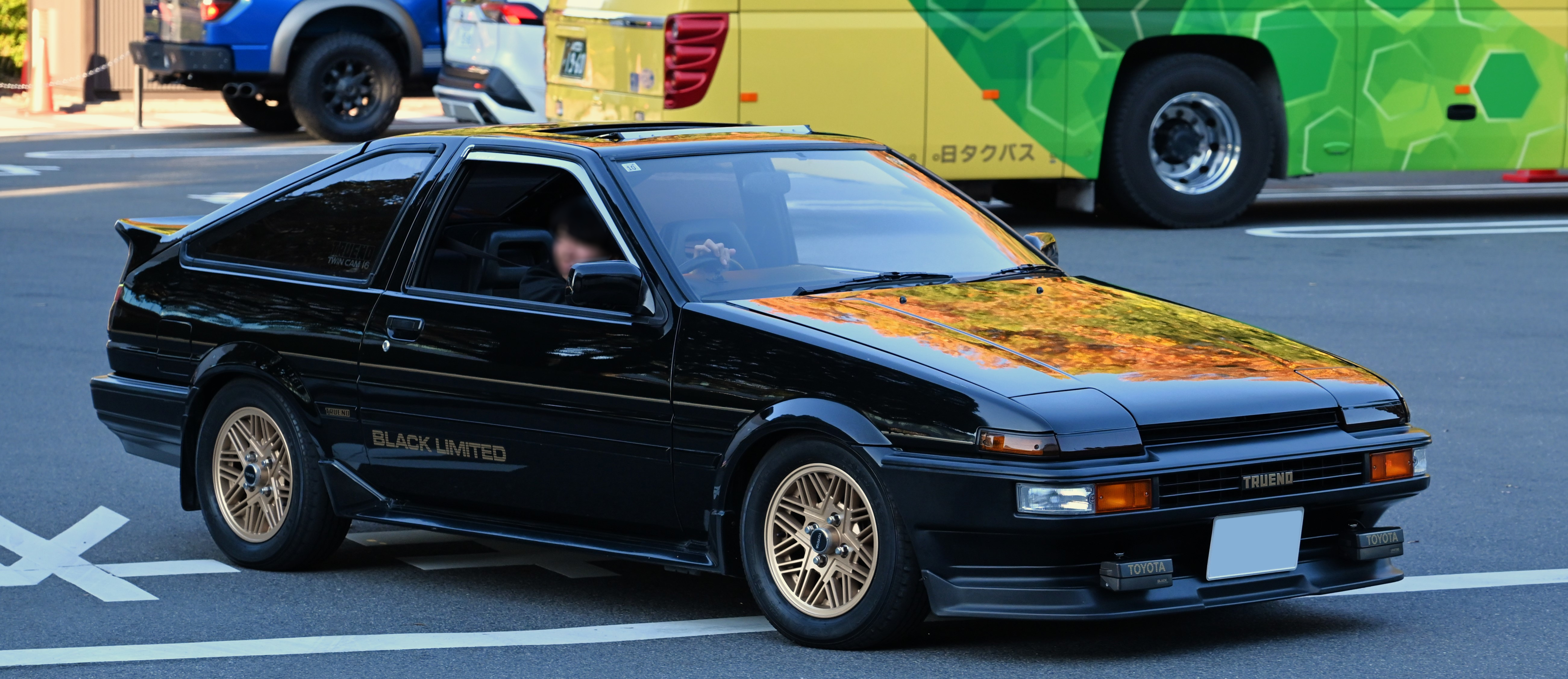
1986 Sprinter Trueno Black Limited liftback

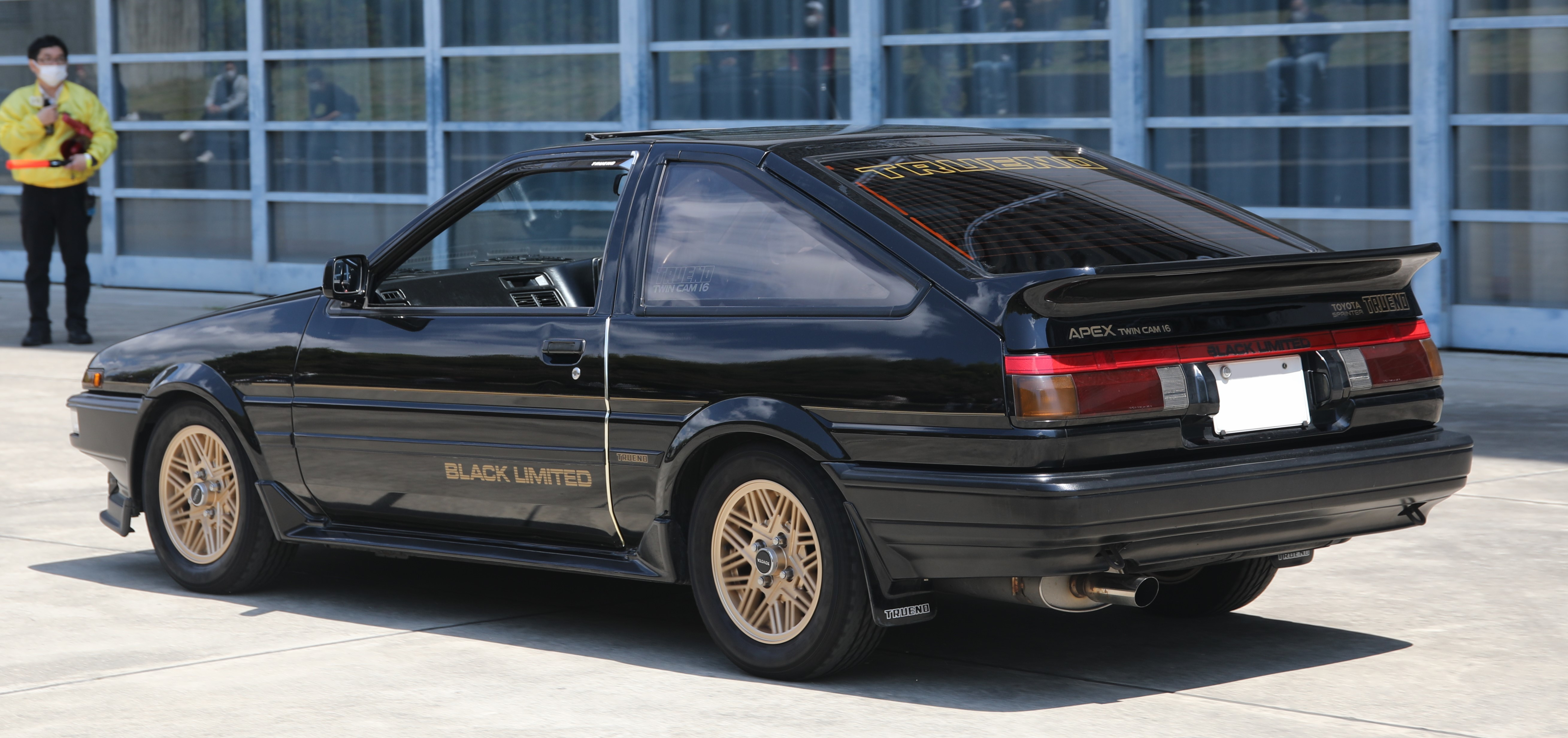
1986 Sprinter Trueno Black Limited liftback

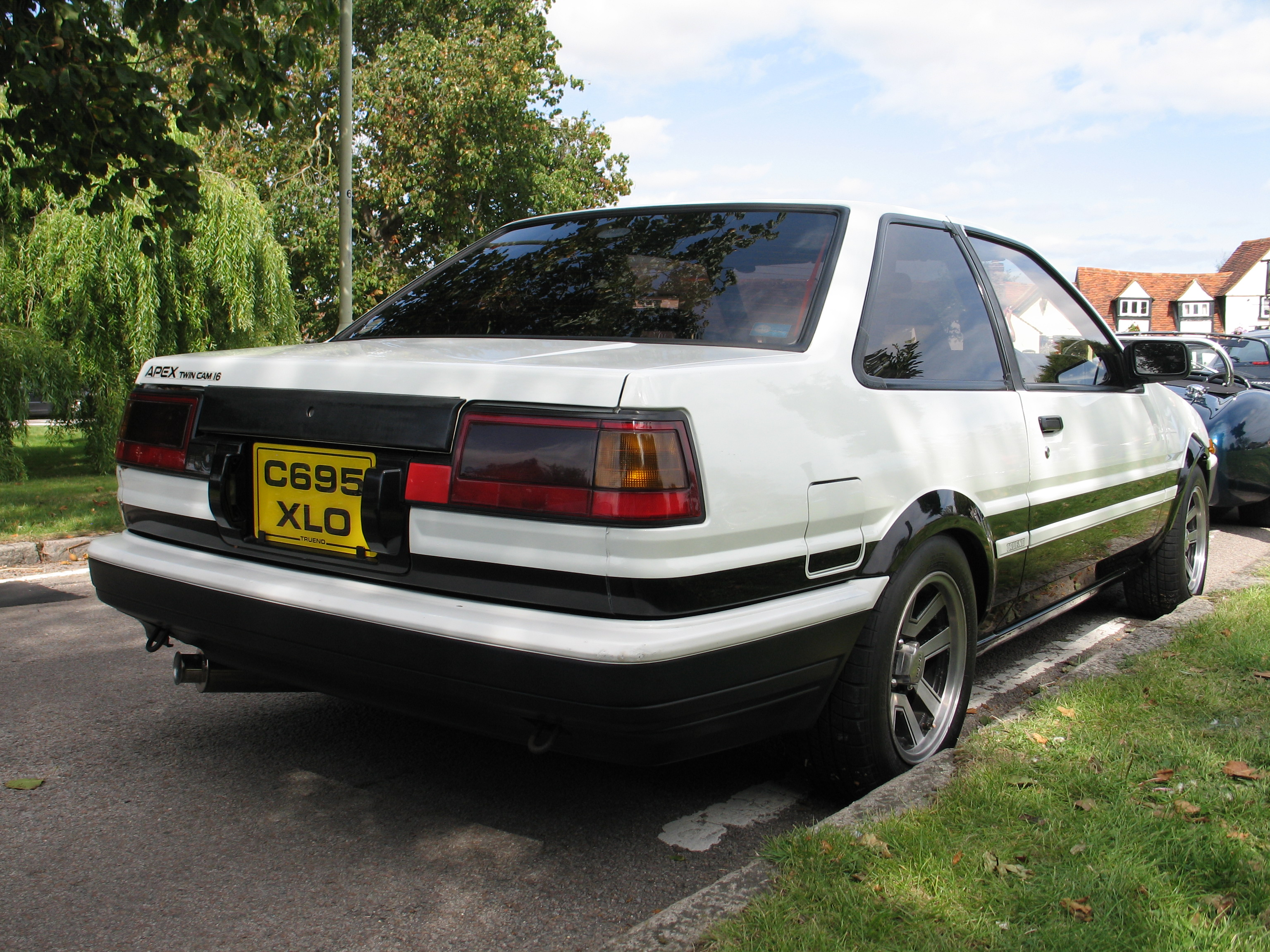
1985–1987 Sprinter Trueno GT APEX coupé

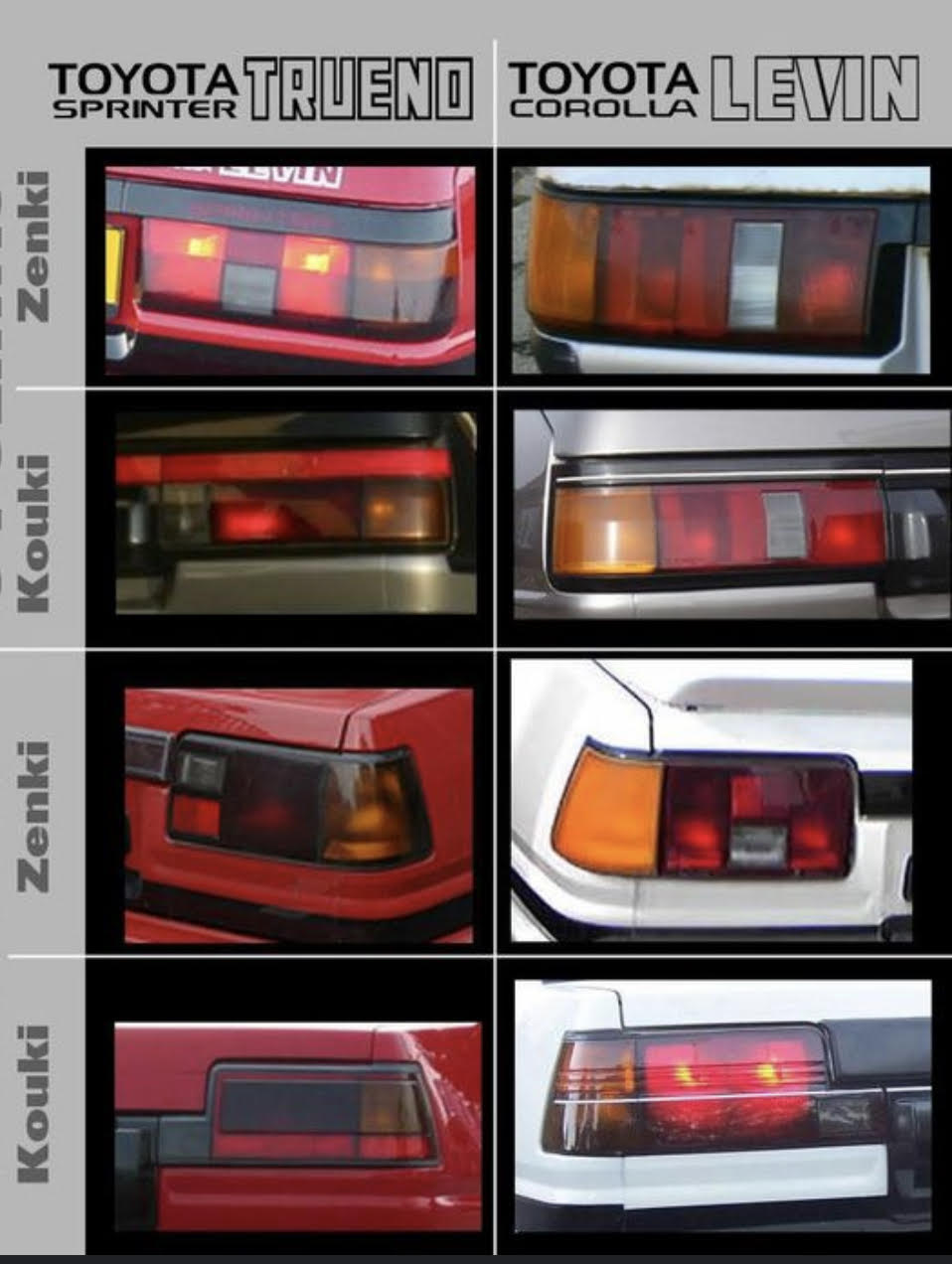
A chart detailing the differences in taillight design of the AE86, showing the Zenki and Kouki versions of the taillights on the 2-door and 3-door versions of the Trueno/Levin.

== Models and specifications ==
=== Japanese AE86 specifications ===
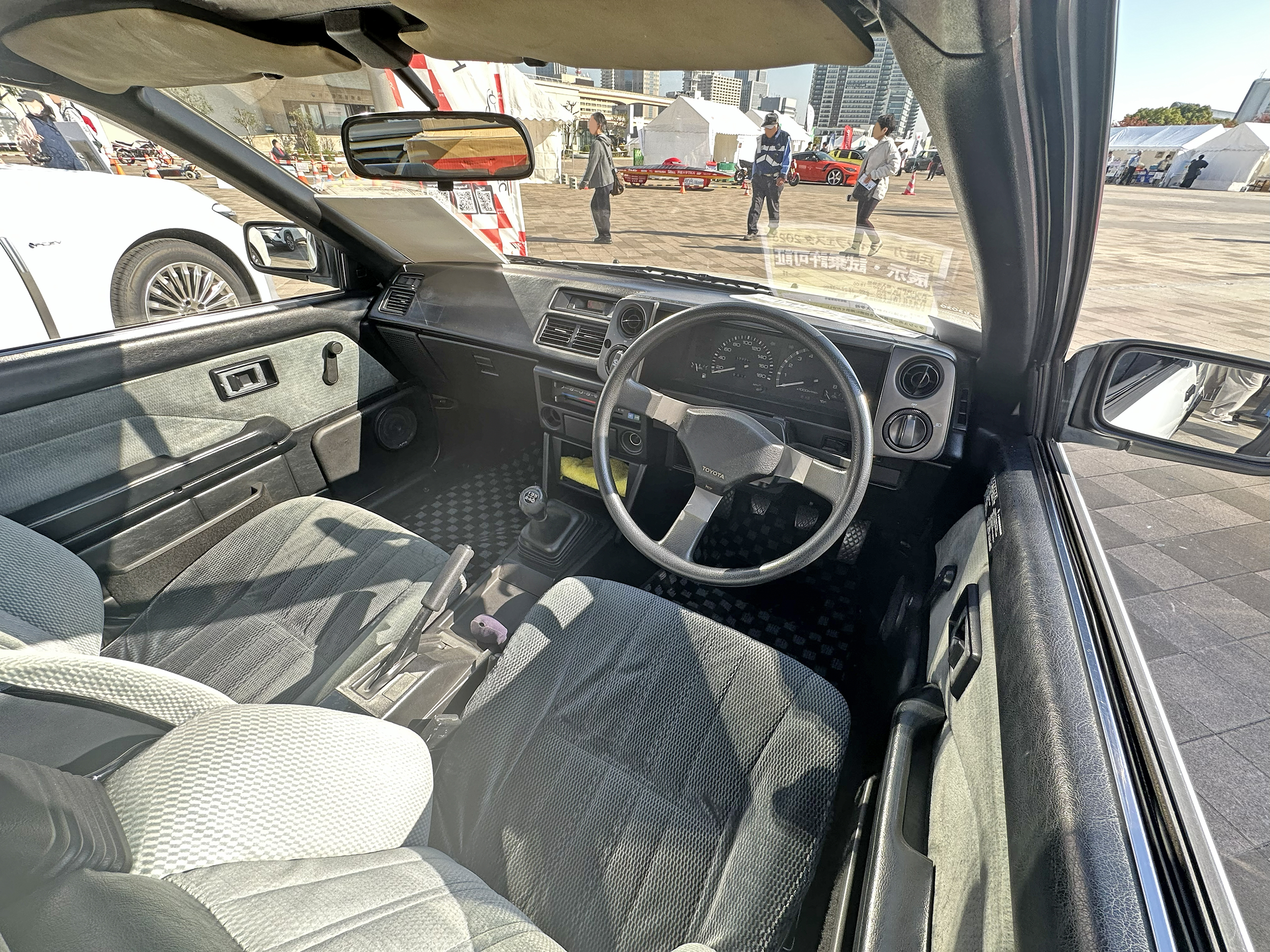
Interior of 1985–1987 GT APEX model

In Japan, the DOHC 4A-GEU AE86 was offered in GT, GTV and GT APEX trims as the Corolla Levin or Sprinter Trueno. All AE86 models produced for Japan featured the 1.6 L 4A-GEU engine, while all AE85 models had the smaller 1.5 L 3A-U engine and not available everywhere else.

=== Japanese model variations ===
==== GT APEX ====
This trim level is the highest level of the AE86, offered in both 2-door and 3-door body styles and coming in both Levin and Trueno versions.

On the exterior, three two-tone paint colors are available, a standard 13-inch alloy wheels and had brown-tinted glass (a feature unique to the GT APEX only, as all other models (including export models) had blue-tinted glass instead). It has power mirrors, adjustable interval windshield wipers, and a rear windshield wiper on liftback models. A special thermostatic flip-up grille was also available as an option on the Levin for the Zenki models. On the interior, they have the interior of the AE86 GT, with a three-spoke steering wheel, sport seats, split-folding rear seat, power steering, a tilting steering column, rear defrost, air conditioning, manual windows, and interior illumination dimming. A five-speed manual transmission is standard, with the option of a four-speed automatic transmission being offered on the Kouki models.

Options for this model include (but not limited to): limited-slip differential (LSD), cruise control, power windows, power sunroof, digital instrument cluster (standard on zenki liftback), automatic air conditioning, OEM aero sports package (available after Sep 1983), optional 14-inch alloy wheels, Alpine sound system, fog lights on the Levin (Kouki models only), mudflaps, and rear hatch visor and quarter window billboards.

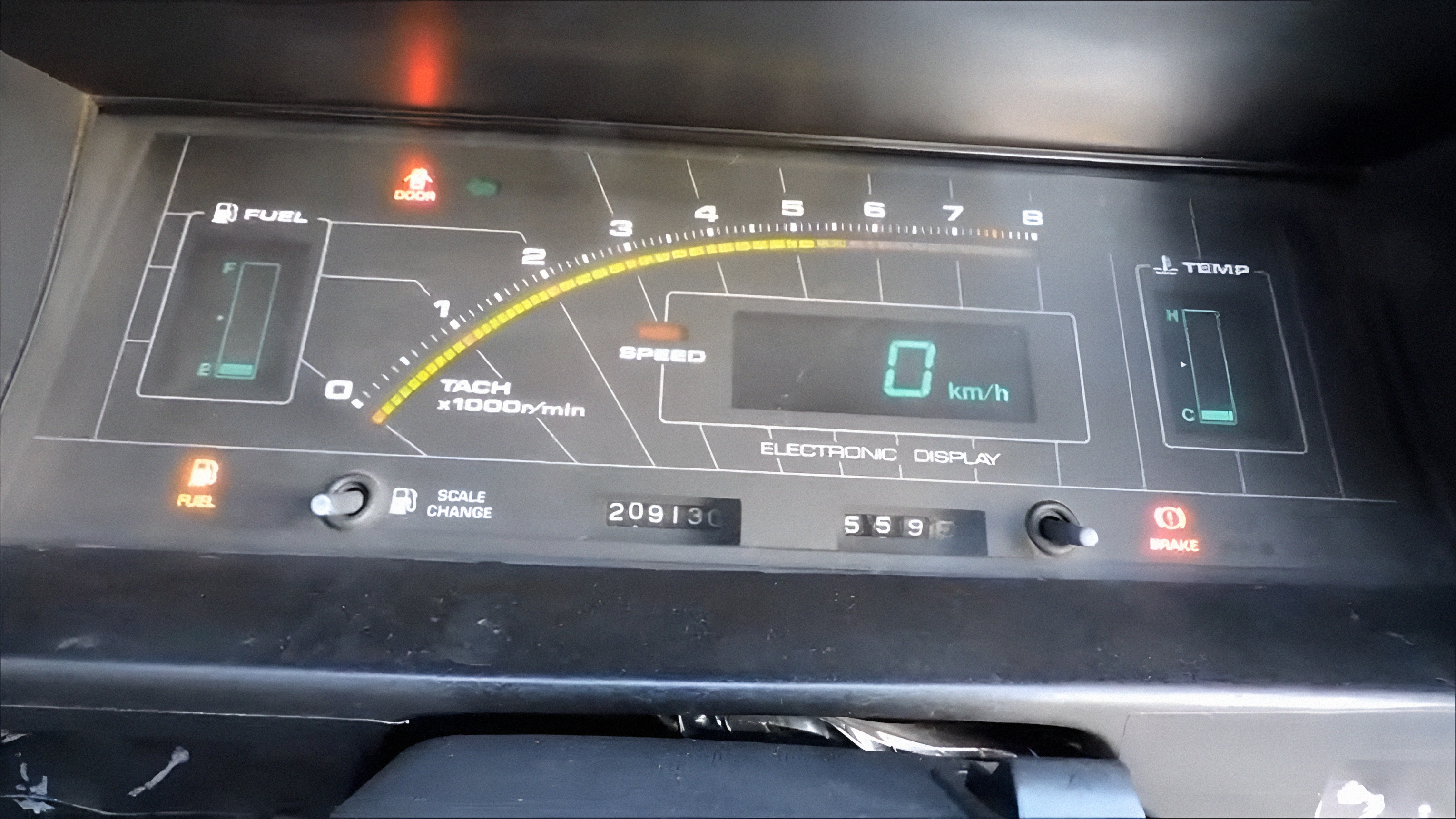
GT APEX optional digital instrument cluster

==== GTV ====
This trim level is the upmarket lightweight-sports grade level of the AE86, coming in both Levin and Trueno versions. It was only offered in the 3-door body style. It features the interior of the AE86 GT, with a three-spoke steering wheel, smaller center console, sport seats, split-folding rear seat, illumination dimming, and manual mirrors and windows. It had blue-tinted glass on the exterior, and had 14-inch steel wheels with disk brakes on the front and rear. Side door decals denoting "GTV Twin Cam 16" were added, exclusive to this model. A five-speed manual transmission is standard.

Options include (but not limited to): two-tone paint colors, air conditioning, power steering, power mirrors, power sunroof, rear wipers, limited-slip differential (LSD), optional 14-inch alloy wheels, OEM aero sports package (available after Sep 1983), mudflaps and body-colored bumpers.

==== GT ====
The GT trim level is the base model of the AE86. It was only offered in the 2-door body style and came in both Levin and Trueno versions. It used the interior of the AE85 SE, with a basic two-spoke steering wheel, smaller center console, basic seats, non split-folding rear seat, and manual mirrors and windows. It had blue-tinted glass on the exterior, and had 13-inch steel wheels with basic disk brakes on the front and drum brakes on the rear. A five-speed manual transmission was standard, with the option of a four-speed automatic transmission being offered on the Kouki models.

Options include (but not limited to): air conditioning, power steering, power mirrors, power sunroof, limited-slip differential (LSD), optional 14-inch alloy wheels, OEM aero sports package (available after Sep 1983), mudflaps, automatic transmission (Kouki models only), and rear defrost.

The GT models were the lightest out of any AE86 models, weighing in at about 900 kg (1,984 lb).

==== Model codes (Sprinter Trueno) ====
- AE86-FCMQF: 4A-GEU, GTV 5MT, 3-door liftback
- AE86-FCMVF: 4A-GEU, GT APEX 5MT, 3-door liftback
- AE86-FCPVF: 4A-GEU, GT APEX 4AT, 3-door liftback (Kouki only, Automatic, A44DE equipped)
- AE86-FSMQF: 4A-GEU, GT 5MT, 2-door coupé
- AE86-FSMVF: 4A-GEU, GT APEX 5MT, 2-door coupe
- AE86-FSPQF: 4A-GEU, GT 4AT, 2-door coupé (Kouki only, Automatic, A44DE equipped)
- AE86-FSPVF: 4A-GEU, GT APEX 4AT, 2-door coupé (Kouki only, Automatic, A44DE equipped)

==== Model codes (Corolla Levin) ====
- AE86-ECMQF: 4A-GEU, GTV 5MT, 3-door liftback
- AE86-ECMVF: 4A-GEU, GT APEX 5MT, 3-door liftback
- AE86-ECPVF: 4A-GEU, GT APEX 4AT, 3-door liftback (Kouki only, Automatic, A44DE equipped)
- AE86-ESMQF: 4A-GEU, GT 5MT, 2-door coupé
- AE86-ESMVF: 4A-GEU, GT APEX 5MT, 2-door coupé
- AE86-ESPQF: 4A-GEU, GT 4AT, 2-door coupé (Kouki only, Automatic, A44DE equipped)
- AE86-ESPVF: 4A-GEU, GT APEX 4AT, 2-door coupé (Kouki only, Automatic, A44DE equipped)

=== North American AE86 specifications ===
The AE86 was sold in North America as the Corolla Sport, but initially only the DX and SR5 with the SOHC 4A-C engine, until the top-spec DOHC 4A-GEC GT-S was added in August 1984. The DX was generally an internal Toyota designation, as brochures and advertising do not include the DX designation, hence it was more uncommon than the SR5 and GT-S.

Both body styles were sold with Trueno pop-up headlights and Levin taillights, a different two-spoke steering wheel, and had longer, heavier 5 mph (8 km/h) regulated bumpers in the front and rear. A minor facelift was occurred in the middle of 1985 (1986 MY), it can be identified by the new taillights, steering wheel and aluminium wheels.

==== DX & SR5 specifications ====
Lower-spec North American AE86 models such as the Sport SR5 used the 1,587 cc (1.6 L) 4A-C SOHC unit, The S-series rear end was a 6.38-inch non-LSD with drum brakes. The SR5 model also had a softer suspension, and small styling and interior changes such as seats, gauge cluster, door panels, un-painted matte black front and rear bumpers, the lower part of the front bumper surround is shorter and flat, and its VIN differs as well, being AE86 for the SR5 model (for North American market cars). The Sport SR5 can also be identified by the "X" identification on the 4th digit of the model code, found on the chassis plate.

Another lower-spec AE86 model was the base-model DX coupé (US only), which had the same 1,587 cc (1.6 L) 4A-C SOHC unit and 6.38-inch non-LSD rear end with drum brakes as the SR5. While being near-identical to the SR5, the DX lacks many of the options and features that were present on the SR5 and GT-S, such as a smaller center console, no rear sway bars, tiny wheels center caps, fuel door with a key hole (84–86), no air conditioning, non split rear bench seat and a very basic interior. The VIN of the DX is AE85 (not to be confused with the Japan-only AE85), but its chassis code on the engine firewall remained as AE86. The base-model DX can also be identified with the "D" identification on the 4th digit of the model code, found on the chassis plate.

- First 7 characters of VIN: JT2AE85 (DX) or JT2AE86 (SR5)
- Chassis code: AE86 (L) (which may differ from the VIN) (L designates LHD)
- Engine: 4A-C, 1,587 cc (1.6 L; 96.8 cu in)
- Engine type: SOHC 8-valve Inline-4 carbureted
- Compression: 9.0:1
- Horsepower: 70 bhp (52 kW; 71 PS) at 4800 rpm (84–86) or 74 bhp (55 kW; 75 PS) at 5200 rpm
- Torque: 115 N⋅m (85 lb⋅ft) (84–86) or 117 N⋅m (86 lb⋅ft) at 2800 rpm
- M/T transmission: T50, 6-bolt flywheel
- A/T transmission: A42DL, 4-speed overdrive w/lockup torque converter, mechanically controlled, with electronically engaged overdrive
- Differential: 6.38 inches (162 mm) open with 4.10:1 ratio, 2-pinion (automatic) (S292) or 3.91:1 ratio, 4-pinion (5-speed) (S314)
- Weight: approximately 2,200 to 2,300 lb (998 to 1,043 kg)
- Wheels/tires: 13×5" +33 mm offset rims with 185/70R13 tires

==== GT-S specifications ====
Higher-spec North American AE86 models known as the Sport GT-S featured the DOHC 4A-GEC engine, four-wheel disc brakes, had a T-series 6.7-inch differential, color-matched bumpers, front lower bumper surround with a much more sporty and pronounced lip, "GT-S Twin Cam 16" side door decals, seat molded door panels, tachometer redline at 7500 rpm, leather-wrapped steering wheel, sport seats with leather-wrapped tops (same as JDM GT APEX), optional LSD, and aluminium wheels. The VIN of the GT-S is AE88 (for North American market cars), however the chassis code on the engine firewall remained as AE86. The Sport GT-S can also be identified by the "Q" identification on the 4th digit of the model code, found on the chassis plate.

- First 7 characters of VIN: JT2AE88
- Chassis code: AE86 (L) (which differs from the VIN) (L designates LHD)
- Engine: 4A-GEC, 1,587 cc (1.6 L; 96.8 cu in)
- Engine type: DOHC 16-valve Inline-4 AFM Multiport Fuel Injection w/T-VIS
- Injector size: . 220 cc (13 cu in), low impedance
- Compression: 9.4:1
- Horsepower: 112 bhp (84 kW; 114 PS) at 6600 rpm
- Torque: 132 N⋅m (97 lb⋅ft) at 4800 rpm
- Transmission: T50, 8-bolt flywheel
- Differential: 6.7 inches (170 mm) Open (T282) or optional LSD (T283) with 4.30:1 Ratio, 2-pinion
- Weight: approximately 2,200 to 2,300 lb (998 to 1,043 kg)
- Wheels/tires: 14×5.5" +27 mm offset rims with 185/60R14 82H tires (195/60R14 85H for 86+ models)

==== Model codes ====
- AE86L-ECMQFA: 4A-GEC, GT-S 5MT, 3-door liftback (USA)
- AE86L-ECMQFK: 4A-GEC, GT-S 5MT, 3-door liftback (Canada)
- AE86L-ECMXCA: 4A-C, SR5 5MT, 3-door liftback (USA)
- AE86L-ECMXCK: 4A-C, SR5 5MT, 3-door liftback (Canada)
- AE86L-ECPXCA: 4A-C, SR5 4AT, 3-door liftback (USA)
- AE86L-ECPXCK: 4A-C, SR5 5MT, 3-door liftback (Canada)
- AE86L-ESMDCA: 4A-C, DX 5MT, 2-door coupé (USA)
- AE86L-ESMQFA: 4A-GEC, GT-S 5MT, 2-door coupé (USA)
- AE86L-ESMQFK: 4A-GEC, GT-S 5MT, 2-door coupé (Canada)
- AE86L-ESMXCA: 4A-C, SR5 5MT, 2-door coupé (USA)
- AE86L-ESMXCK: 4A-C, SR5 5MT, 2-door coupé (Canada)
- AE86L-ESPDCA: 4A-C, DX 4AT, 2-door coupé (USA)
- AE86L-ESPXCA: 4A-C, SR5 4AT, 2-door coupé (USA)
- AE86L-ESPXCK: 4A-C, SR5 4AT, 2-door coupé (Canada)
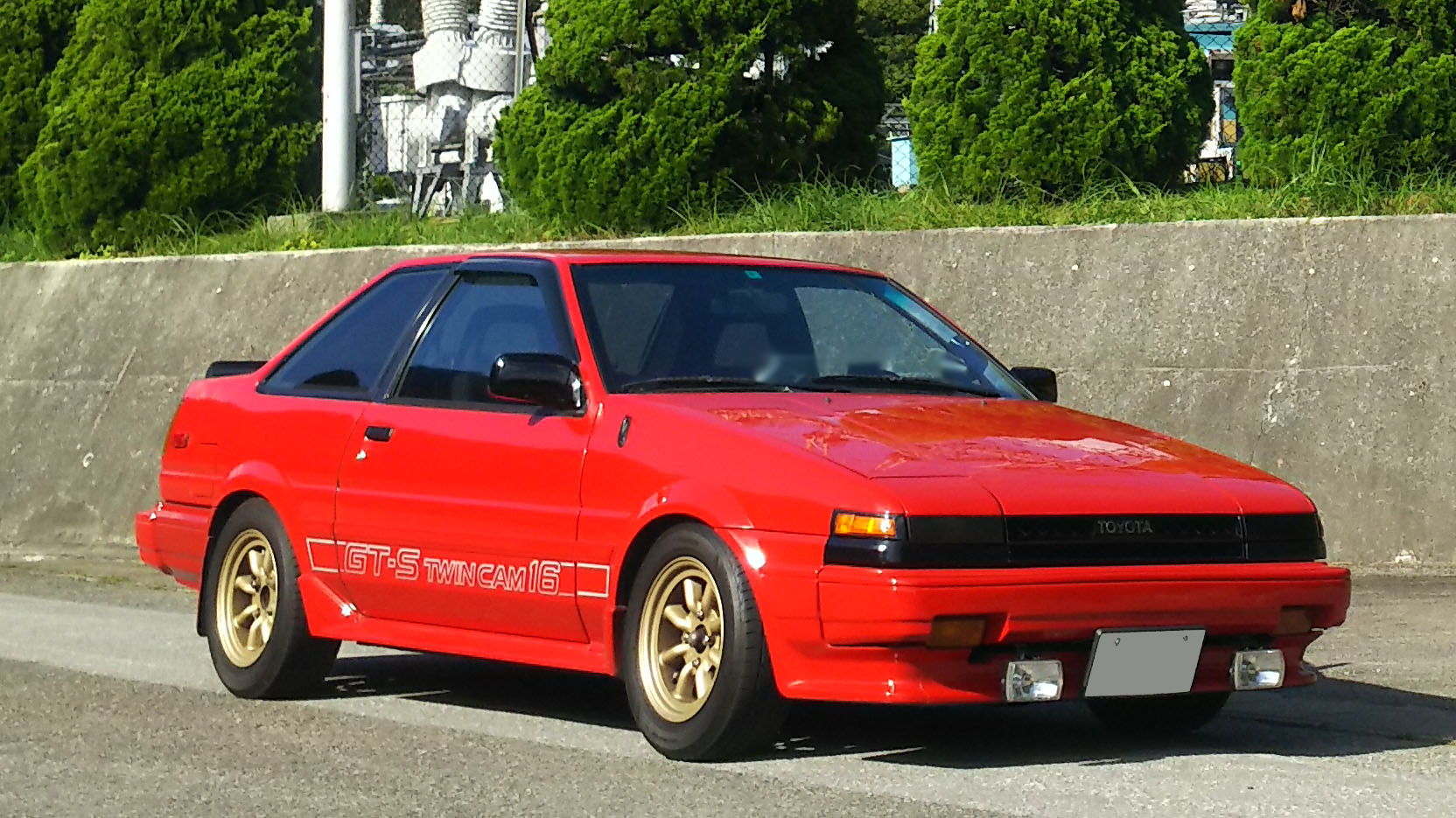
Corolla Sport GT-S coupé

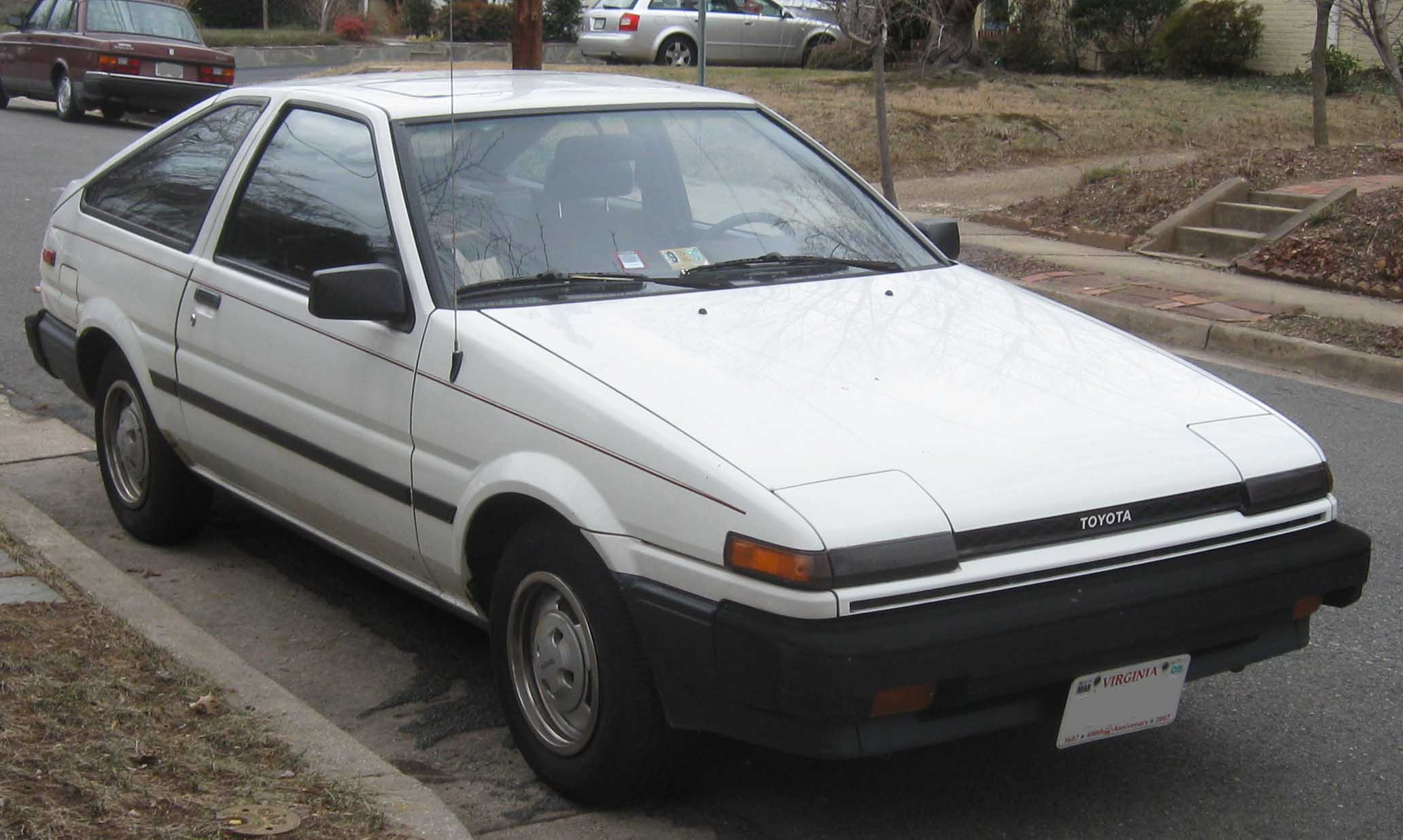
Corolla Sport SR5 liftback

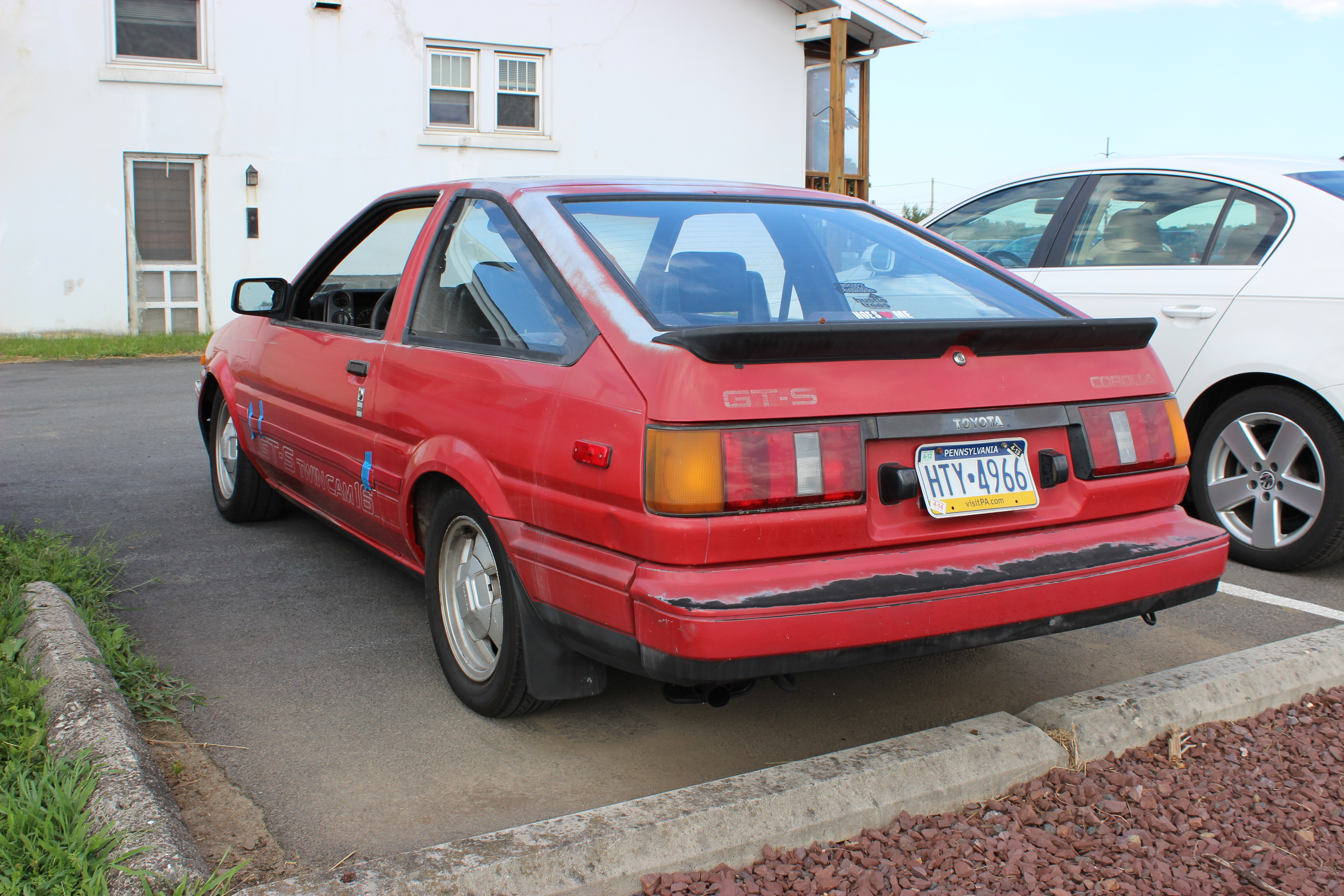
1984–1986 MY Corolla Sport GT-S liftback

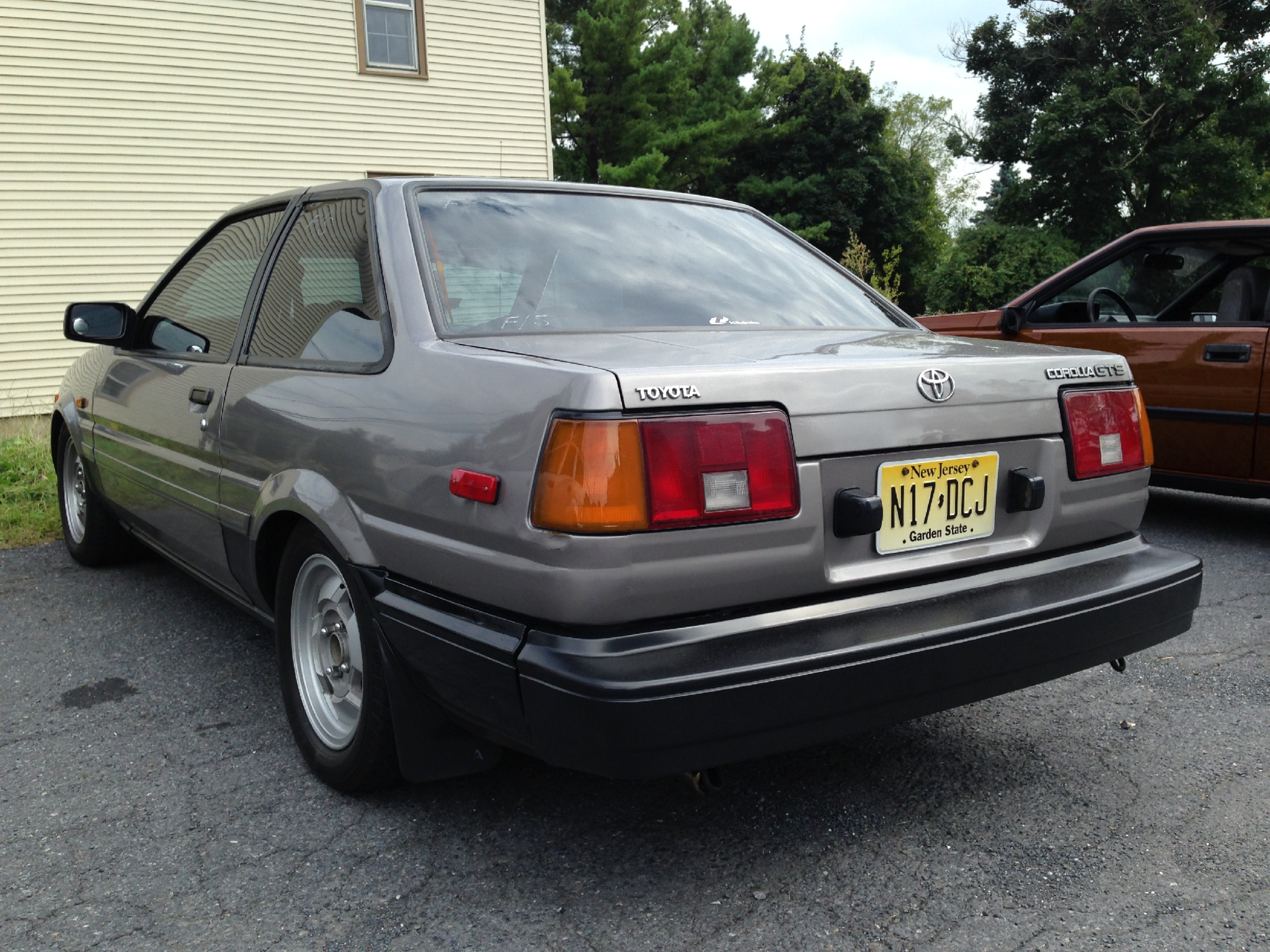
1984–1986 MY Corolla Sport GT-S coupé

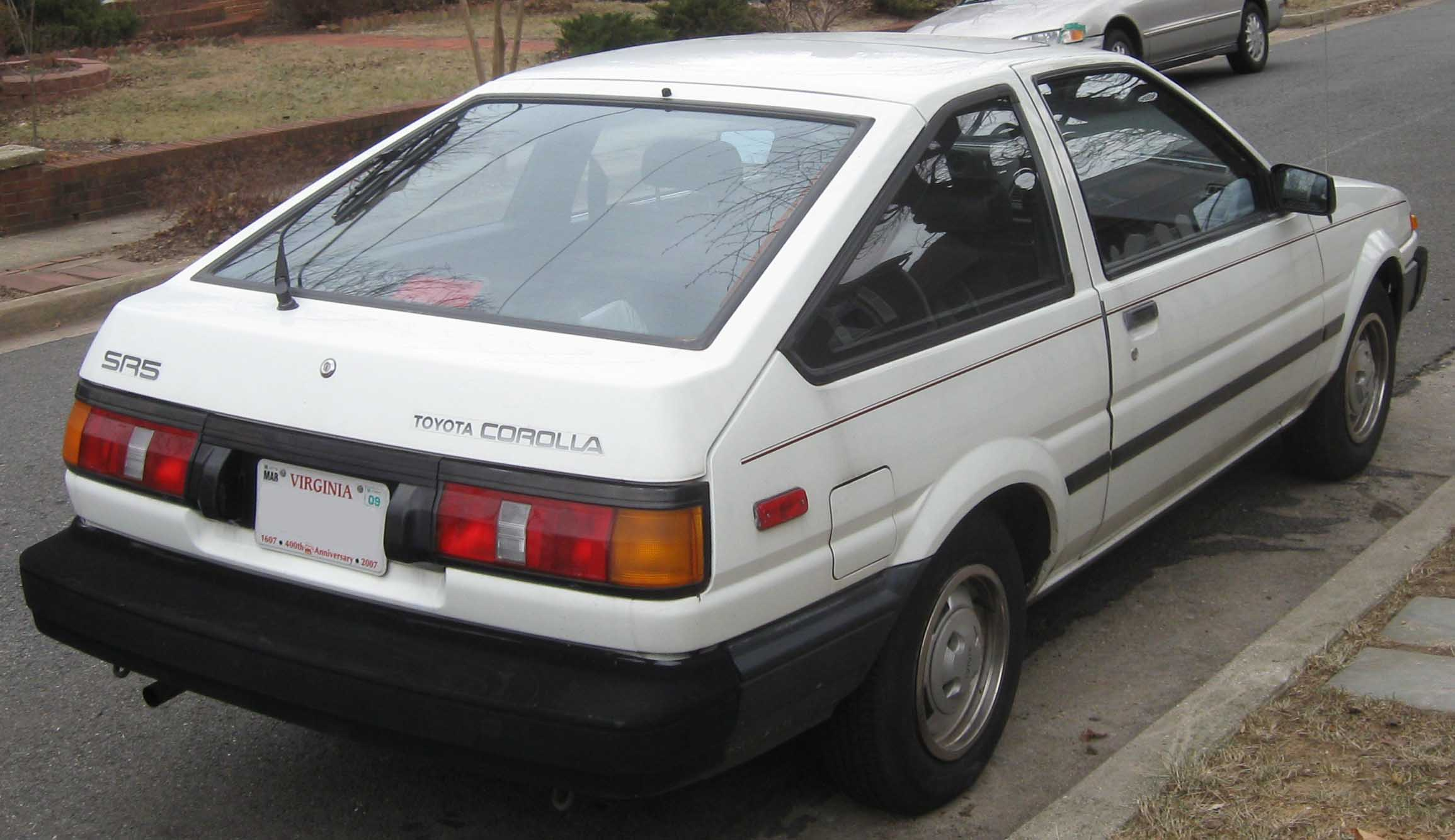
1986–1988 MY Corolla Sport SR5 liftback

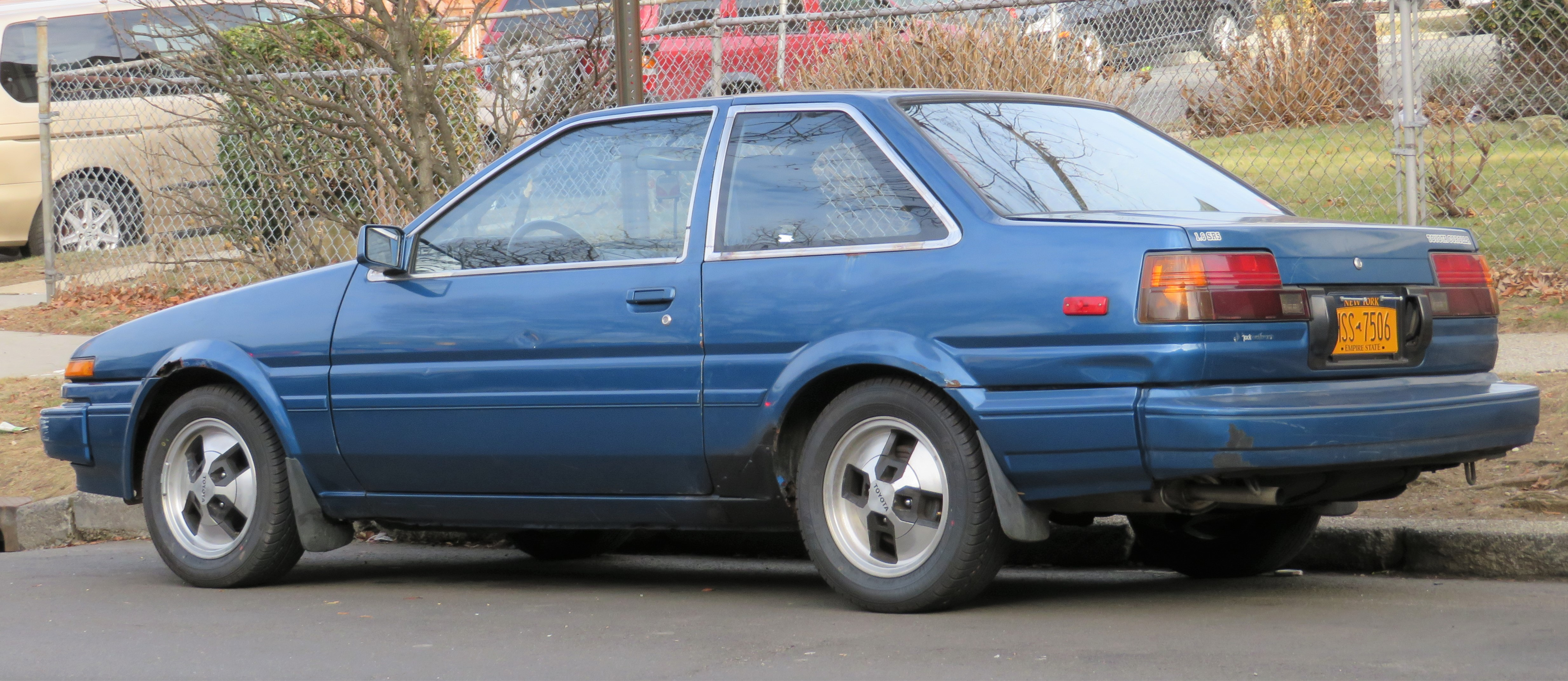
1986–1988 MY Corolla Sport SR5 coupé

=== Rest of the world ===
The European market AE86 was based on the Corolla Levin and marketed as the Corolla GT (or GTi) and SR, the latter was only offered in Sweden and Switzerland. Unlike the Levin, this model featured a front grille with a "TOYOTA" badge instead of "LEVIN". In the 1985 facelift, only the front end was revised. Both body styles were available in Europe, but depending on the country, not all body styles were offered. For example, the coupé was the only option in the Netherlands, and the liftback was the only option in the UK/Ireland, but both were available in West Germany. Other exterior differences can be identified by the additional turn signal on the front fenders, rear license plate lights that illuminate from below, fuel door with a key hole, standard aero kit, hubcaps (pre-facelift) and optional headlights washer. The interior and equipments are very similar to the kouki JDM GTV and AE85 SR. The 4A-GE engine with a MAP sensor and without a catalytic converter was the only option in Europe, except for Sweden and Switzerland, which were initially only offered the SR liftback with the 4A-C engine. In 1985, the North American 4A-GEC became the standard engine in Sweden and Switzerland, but also as an option in West Germany and sold alongside the regular 4A-GE version. The T50 five-speed manual was the only gearbox in Europe, an optional T283 LSD was also available.

The general markets (selected countries in the Americas, Asia-Pacific and Caribbean islands) AE86 was also sold as GT and SR. The former was a liftback, while the latter was available for both body styles. It is very identical to the European model, but lacked the additional turn signal on the front fenders and headlight washer, but featured a standard internal fuel door opener. The GT was only paired to a five-speed manual and also with an optional LSD, while four-speed automatic was available as an option for the SOHC 4A-powered SR.

In Australia, the AE86 was also based on the general specification Corolla SR, but marketed as the Toyota Sprinter liftback. It featured the taillights from the Trueno but only came with the 4A-C engine.

The AE86 Corolla GT liftback was sold in the Middle East (GCC) with the exterior of the North American market Corolla GT-S, but lacked the rear side marker lights and featured a three-spoke steering wheel. It only came with the general specification 4A-GE engine and five-speed manual gearbox with an optional LSD.

==== Model codes (Europe) ====
- AE86L-ECMQFC: 4A-GEC, GT 5MT, 3-door liftback (Sweden and Switzerland)
- AE86L-ECMQFG: 4A-GEC, GT 5MT, 3-door liftback (West Germany)
- AE86L-ECMQFW: 4A-GE, GT 5MT, 3-door liftback
- AE86R-ECMQFW: 4A-GE, GT 5MT, 3-door liftback (right-hand drive)
- AE86L-ECMXCC: 4A-C, SR 5MT, 3-door liftback (Sweden and Switzerland)
- AE86L-ESMQFG: 4A-GEC, GT 5MT, 2-door coupé (West Germany)
- AE86L-ESMQFW: 4A-GE, GT 5MT, 2-door coupé

==== Model codes (general) ====
- AE86L/R-ECMQF: 4A-GE, GT 5MT, 3-door liftback
- AE86L-ECMQFV: 4A-GE, GT 5MT, 3-door liftback (Middle East)
- AE86R-ECMXCQ: 4A-C, SR 5MT, 3-door liftback (Australia)
- AE86L/R-ECMXS: 4A, SR 5MT, 3-door liftback
- AE86L/R-ESMXS: 4A, SR 5MT, 2-door coupé
- AE86L-ESPXS: 4A, SR 4AT, 2-door coupé (left-hand drive only)
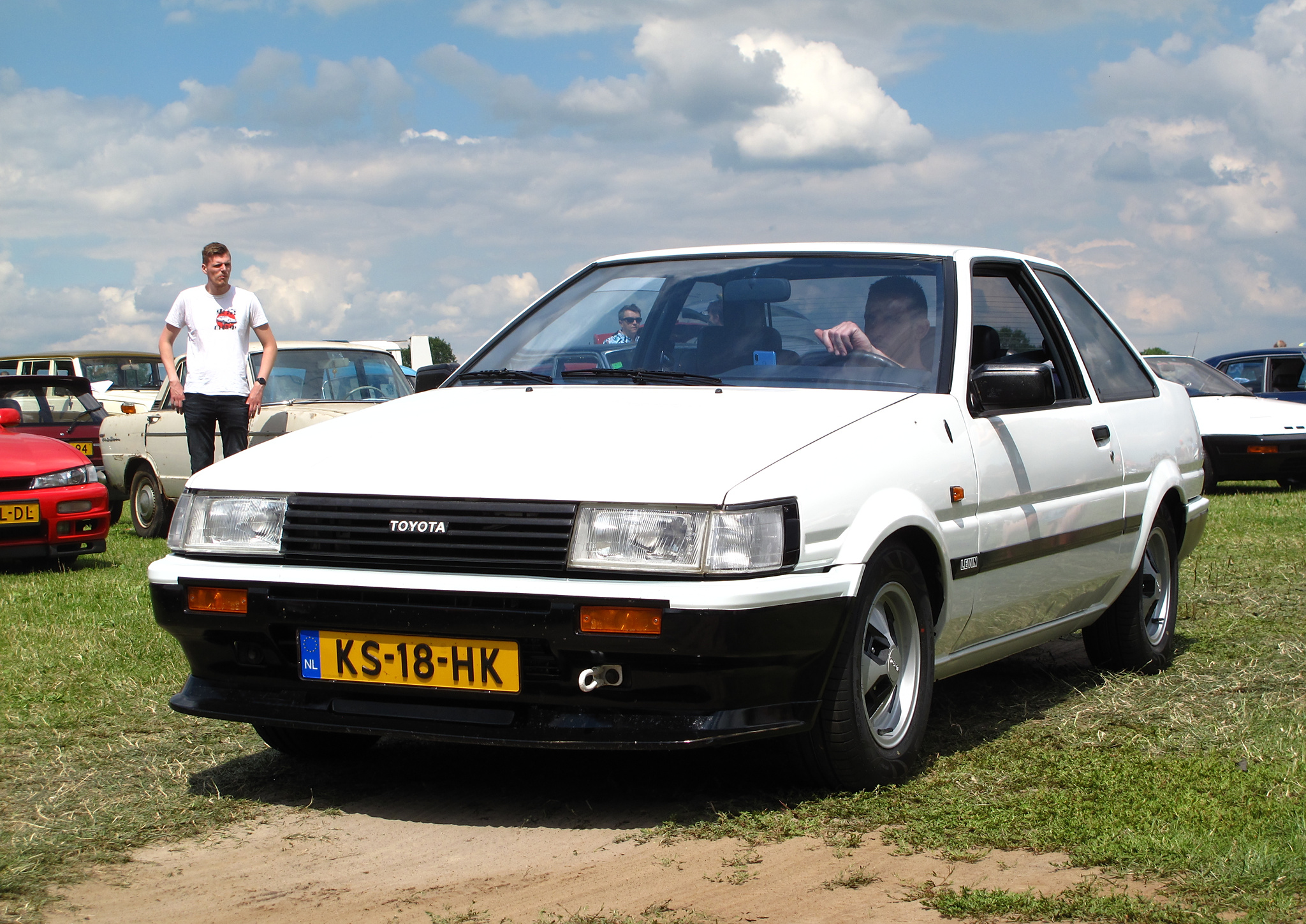
1983–1985 Corolla GT coupé

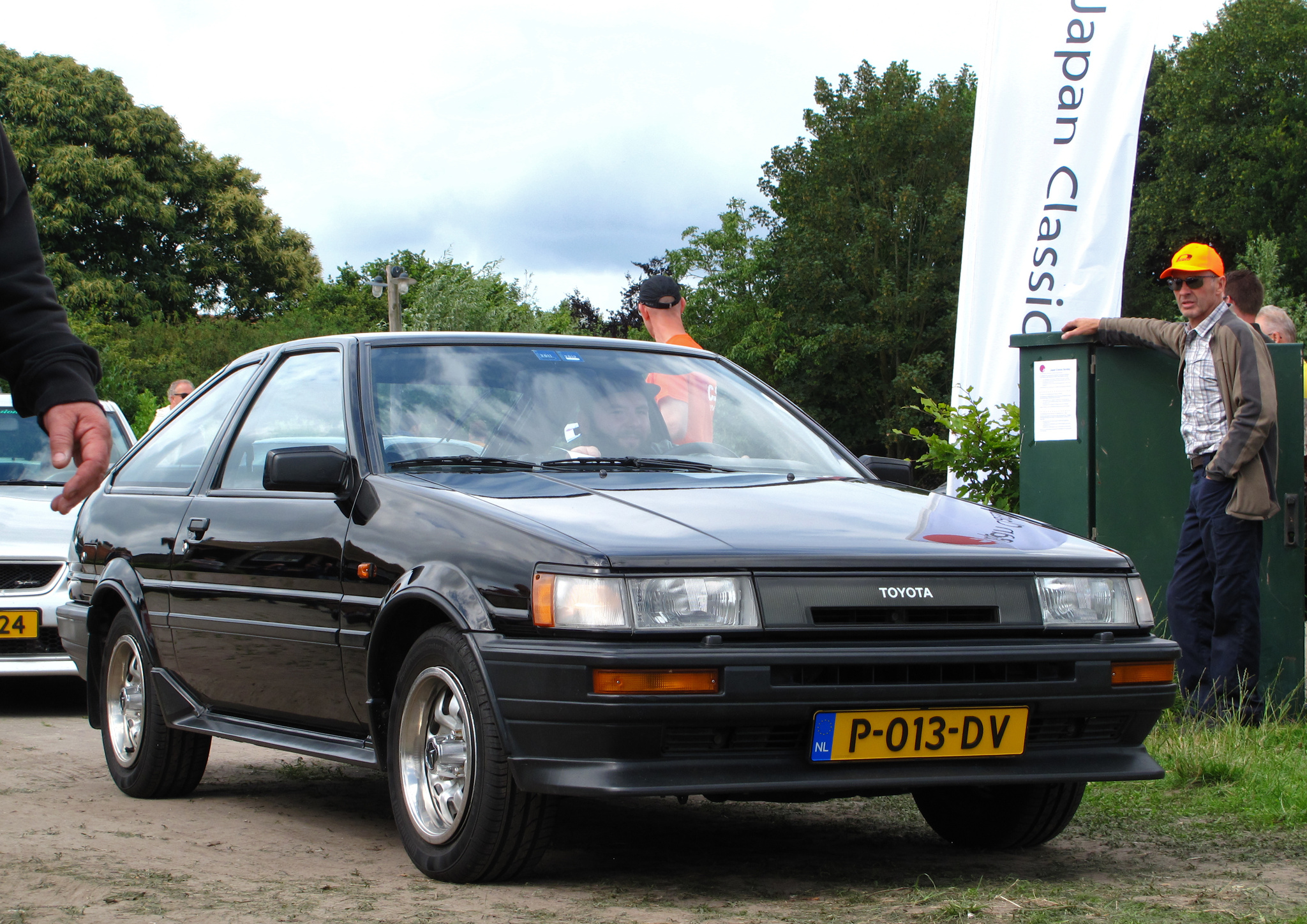
1985–1987 Corolla GT liftback

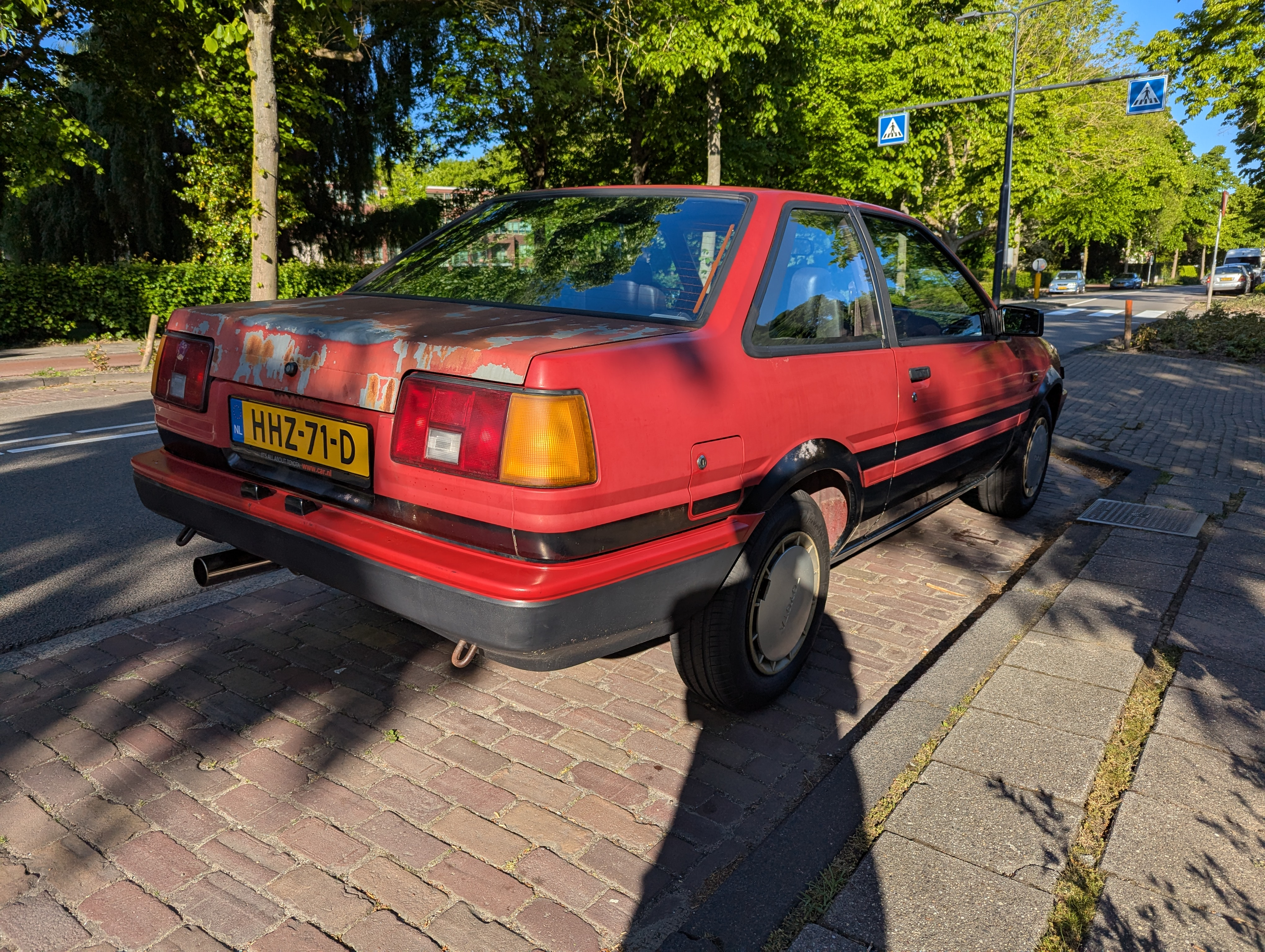
Corolla GT coupé

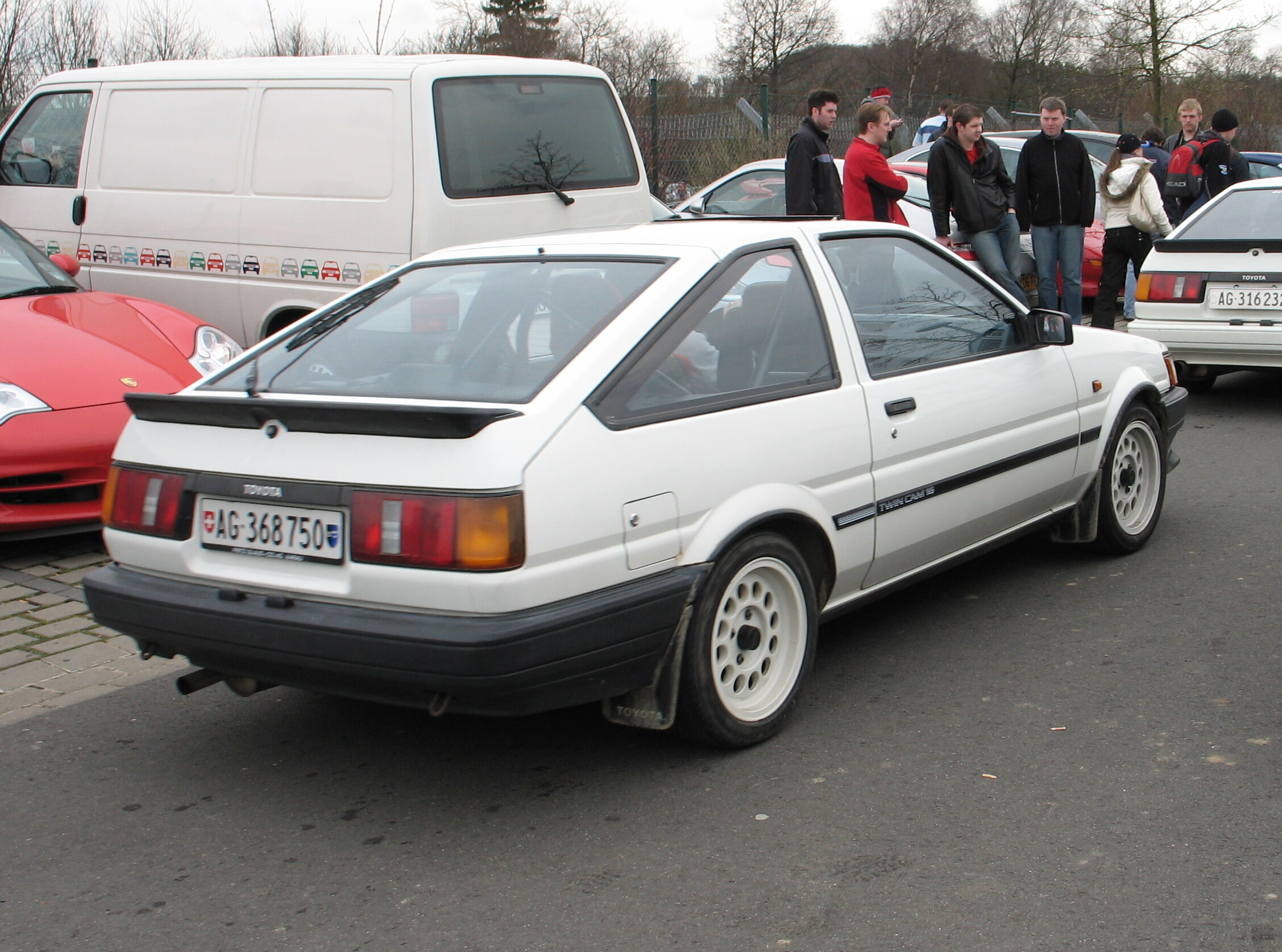
Corolla GT liftback

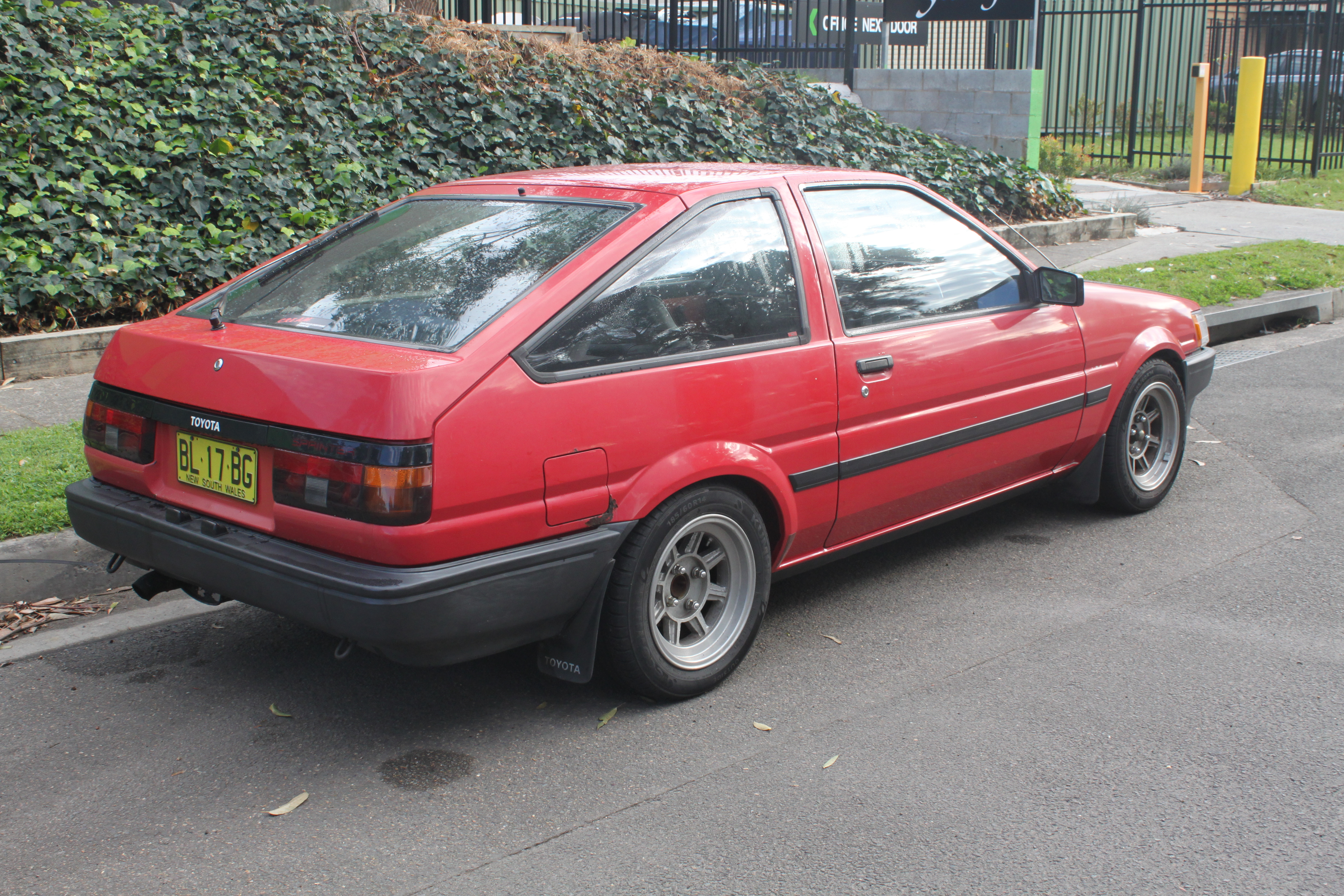
Australian market Toyota Sprinter liftback

== H2 and BEV concepts ==
In January 2023 at the Tokyo Auto Salon, Toyota Gazoo Racing (TGR) and Lexus exhibited two AE86 liftbacks concept cars called H2 and BEV Concepts that have been converted to run using a hydrogen engine and a battery-electric system. The H2 concept was based on the Sprinter Trueno and converted by TGR to run on hydrogen fuel while retaining the original 1.6 L engine that received special modifications, including fuel injectors, fuel pipes, and spark plugs and combined with two high-pressure hydrogen storage tanks from the Mirai. The BEV concept was based on the Corolla Levin that was converted as a battery electric vehicle by Lexus by combining an electric motor from the Tundra Hybrid, an 18.1-kWh battery from Prius PHEV/Lexus RX450h+ and also featured a manual transmission.

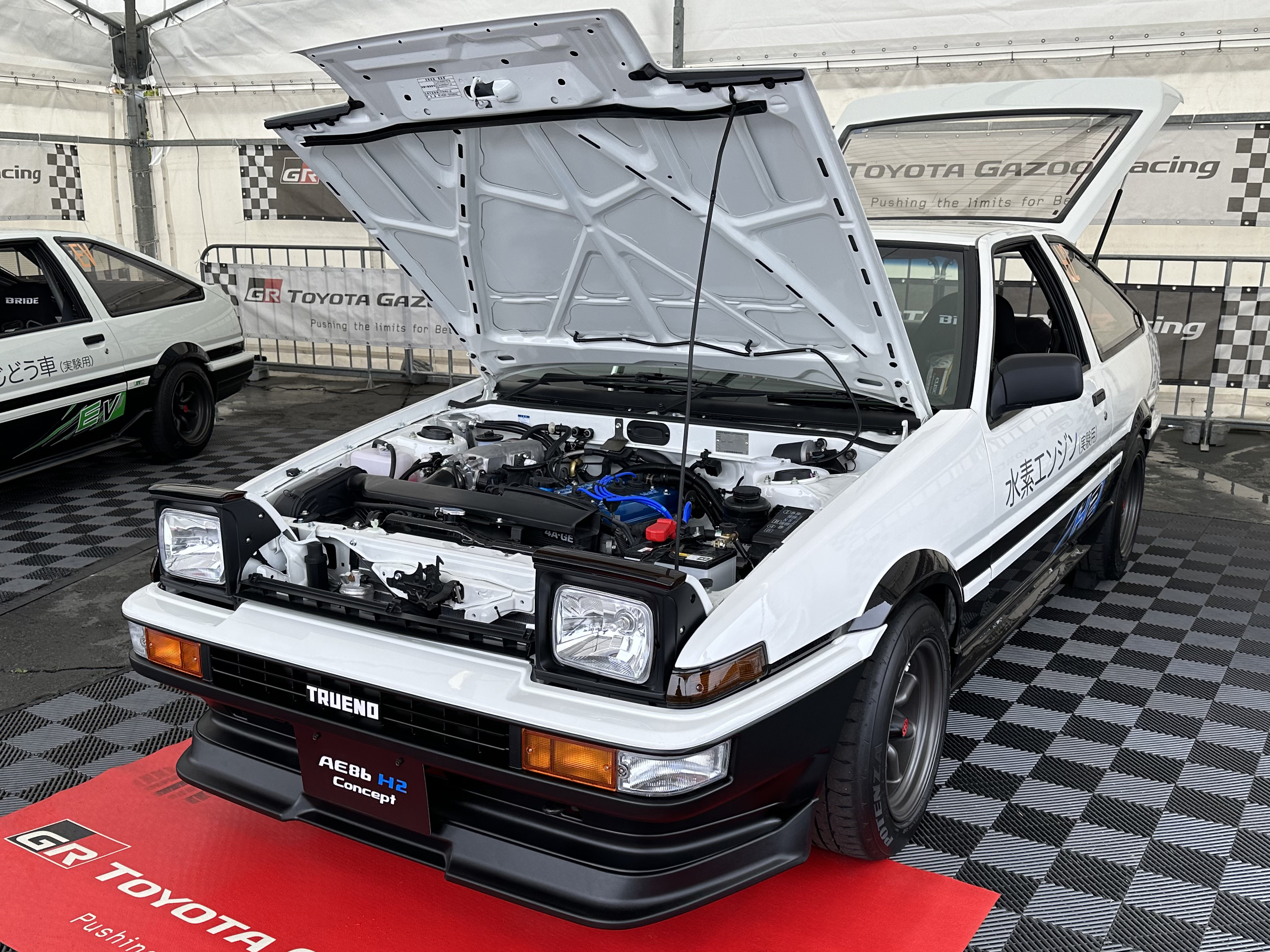
AE86 H2 Concept

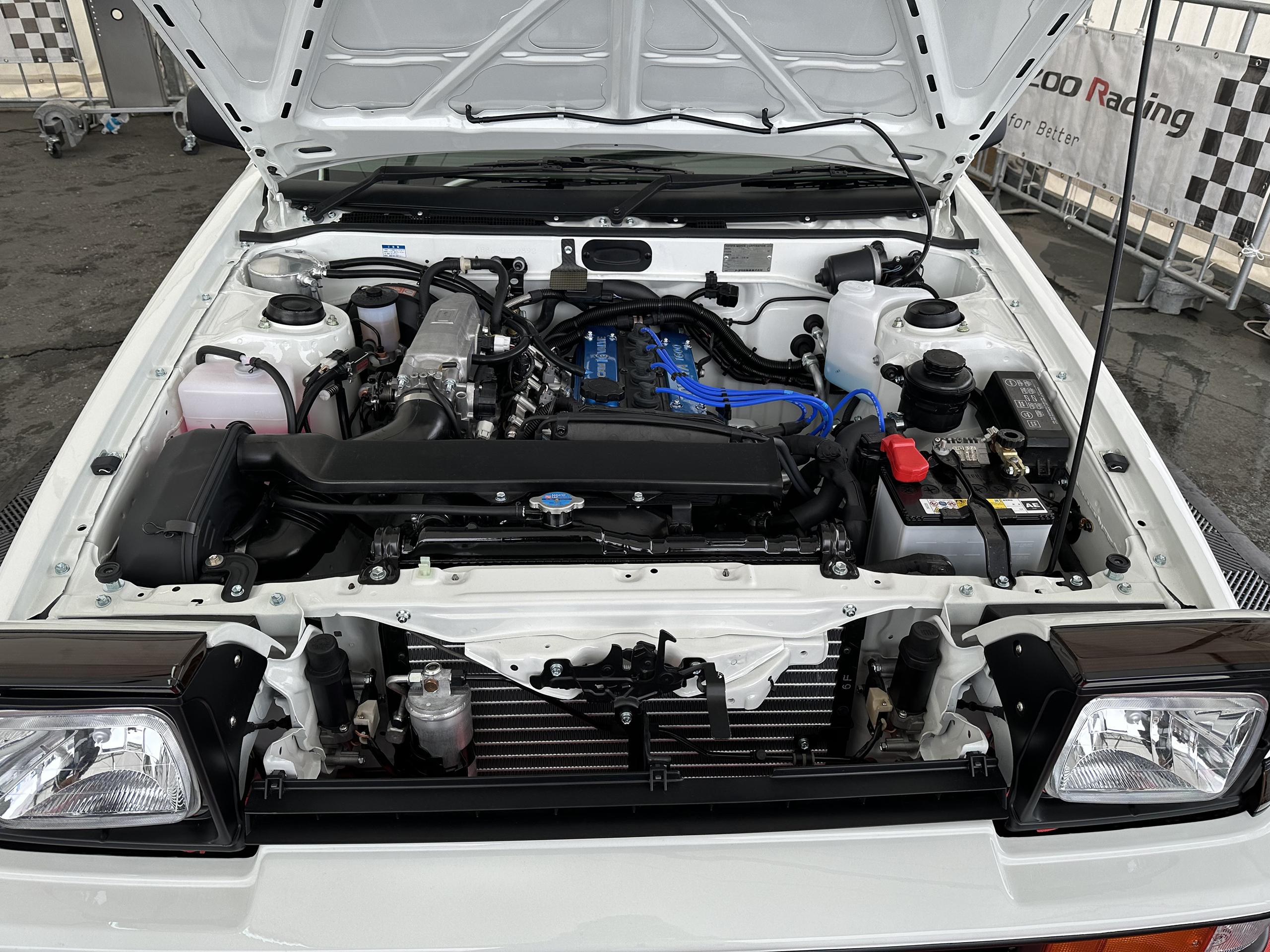
Hydrogen-fueled 4A-GE engine

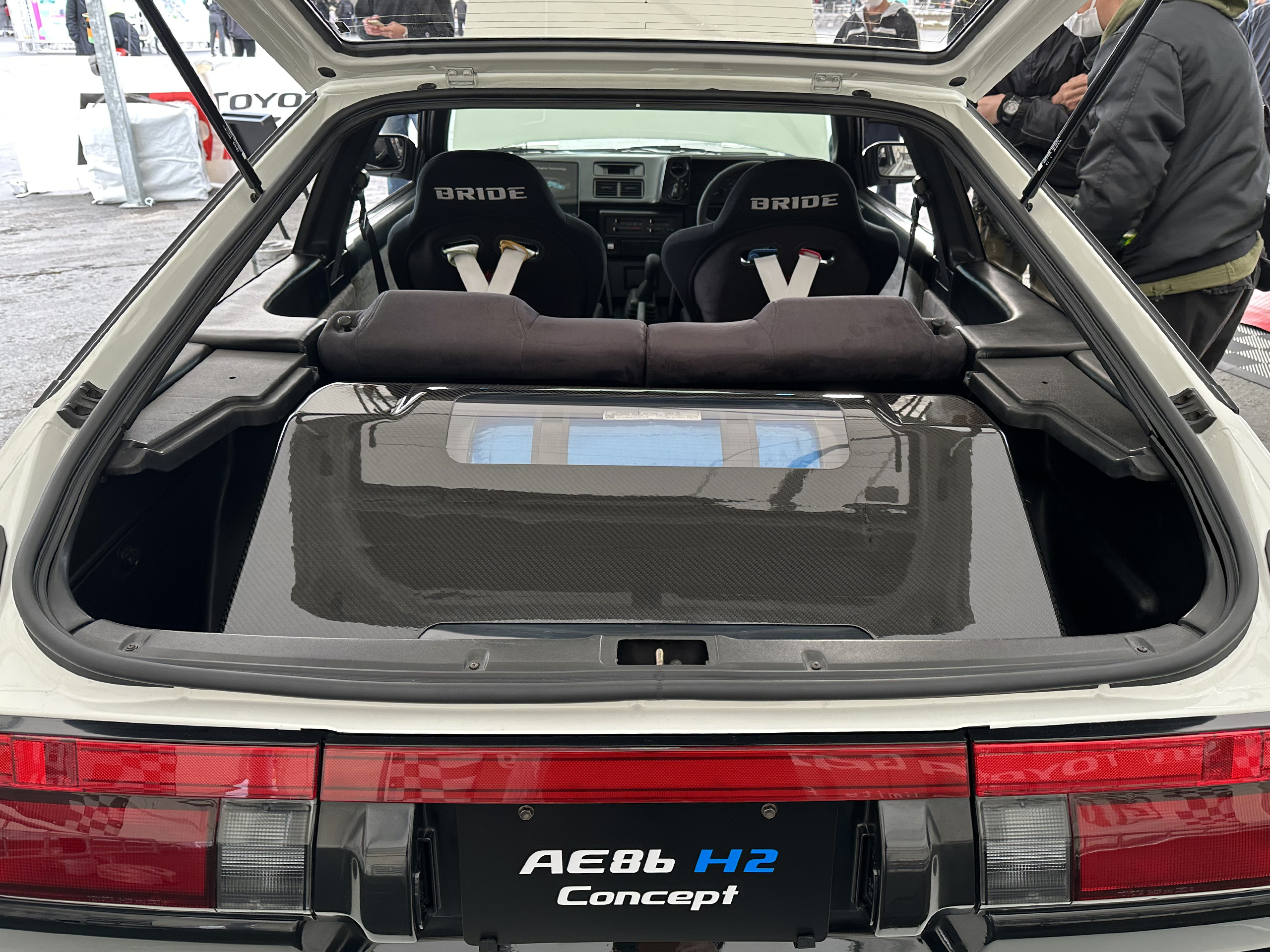
Hydrogen tanks

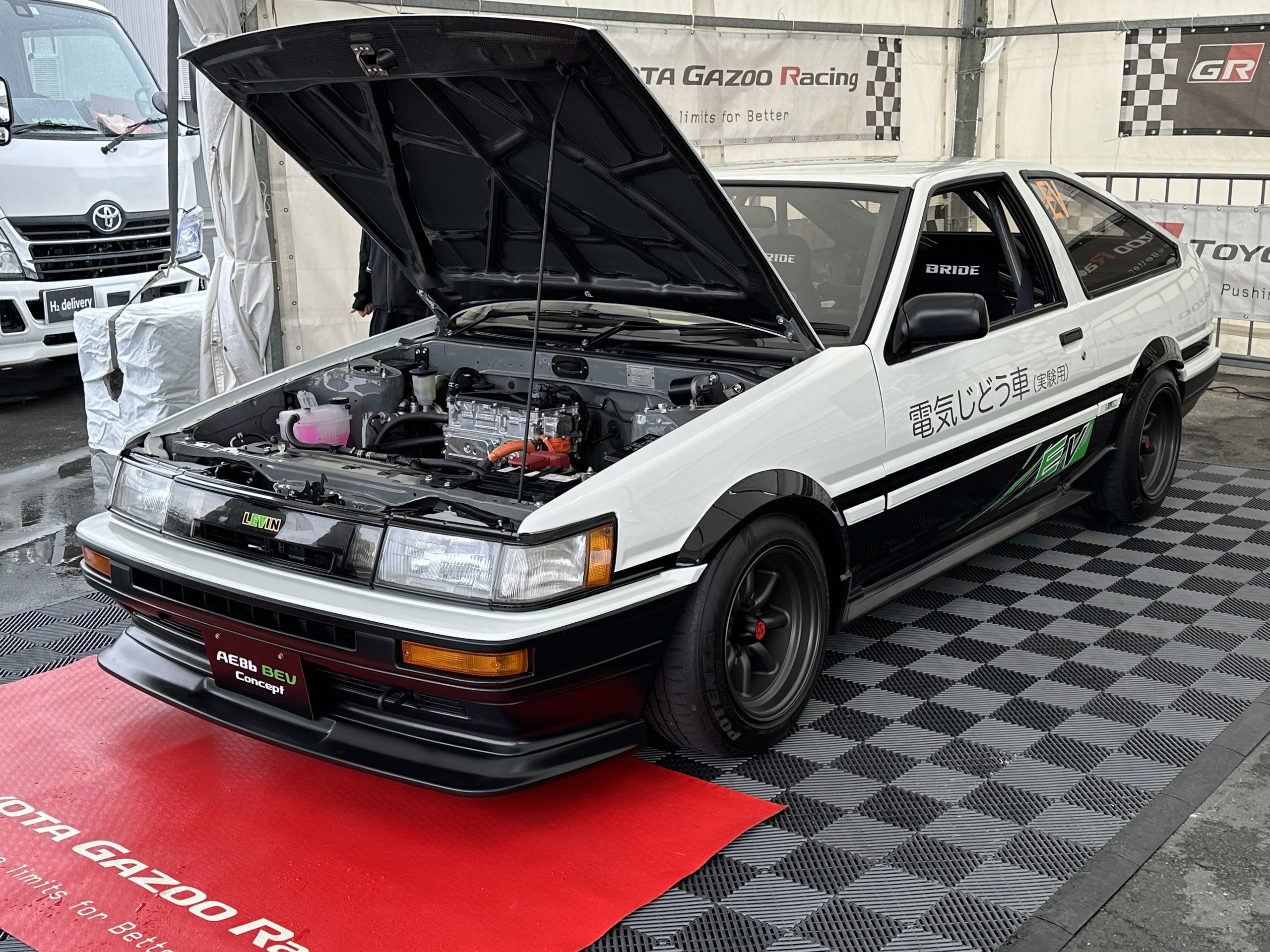
AE86 BEV Concept

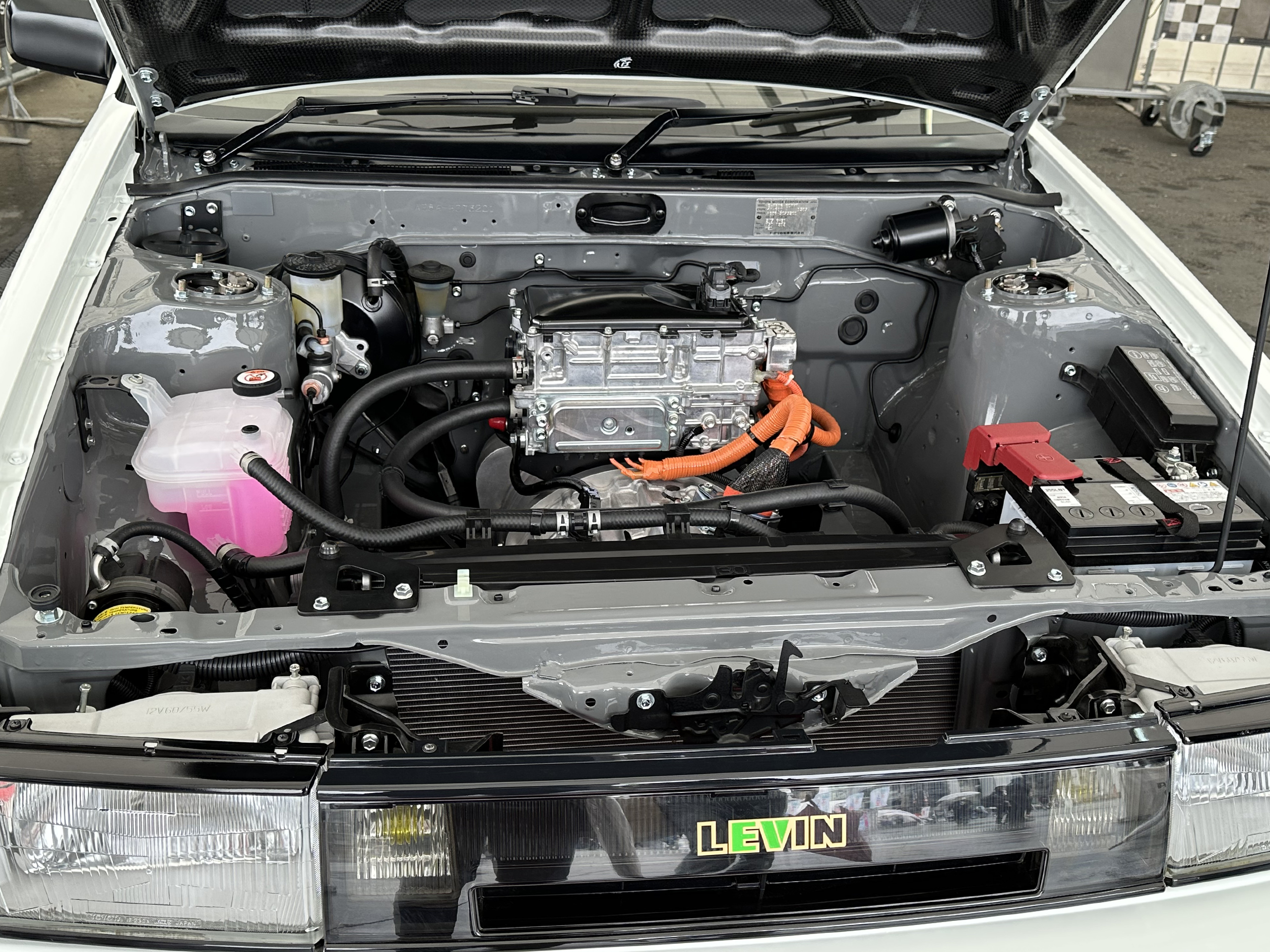
Electric motor

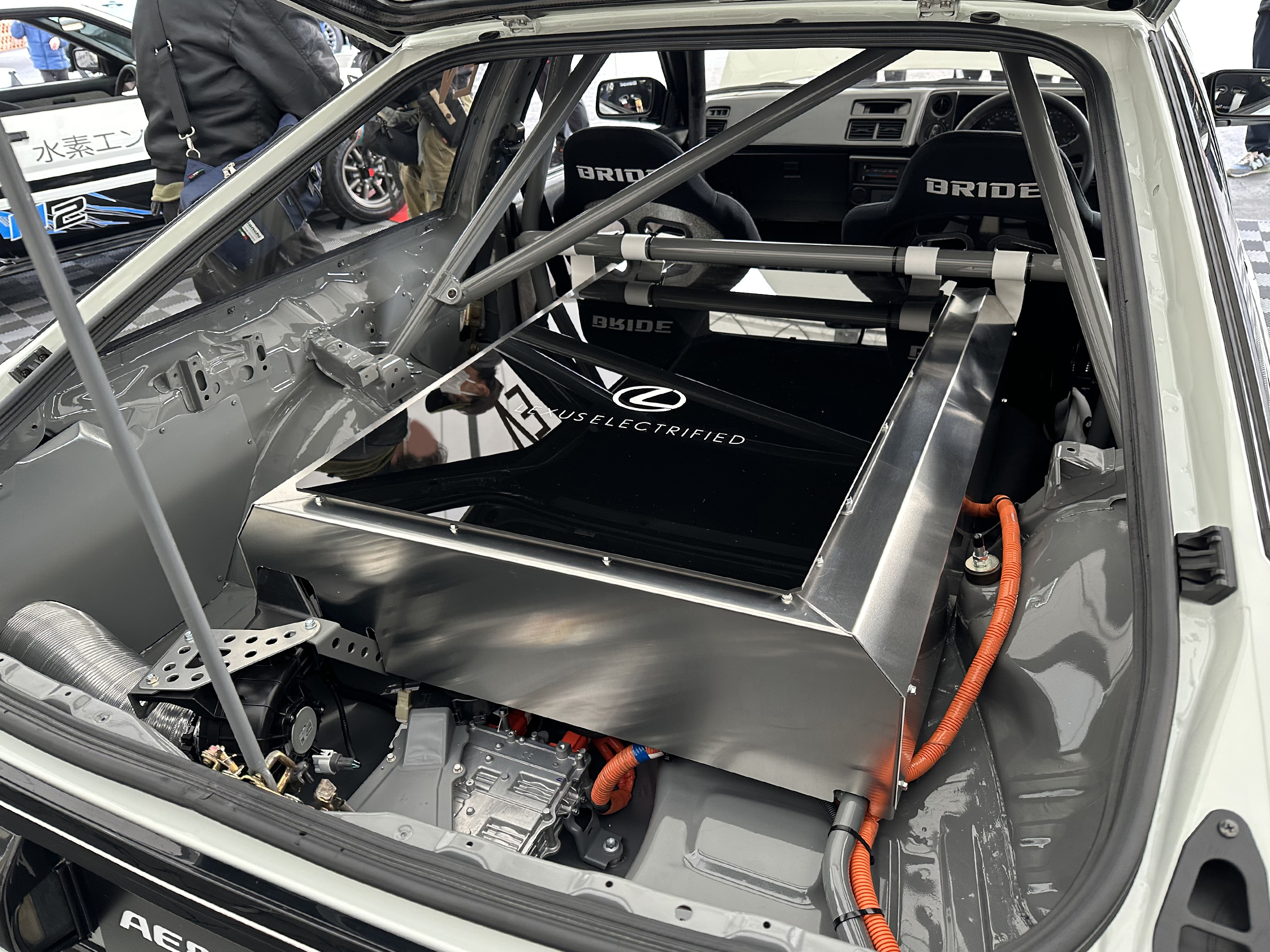
Battery pack

== Motorsports ==
During its production run, the AE86 was a popular choice for showroom stock, Group A, and Group N racing, especially in rallying and circuit races. It competed in the under 2.0 L class, mostly in 1401 to 1600 cc A6 or N2 classes. After the production ended, many privateer teams continued to race the AE86, and it remains a popular choice for rallying and club races today.

Part of the continued appeal of the AE86 for motorsports is its rear-drive configuration, not available in most newer lightweight coupes. In Group A touring car races, the car either dominated the lower category where eligible or fought it out with Honda Civics or the later AE92s and AE101s whilst maintaining its competitiveness. In Ireland, where rallying is considered one of the most popular forms of motorsport, as organizing regulations are more relaxed compared to that of other countries, the AE86 was popular when new, and remains so popular that teams will purchase cars from the UK and Japan due to local shortages. The AE86 is also popular for rally use in Finland, where the cars can be competitive in the F-Cup competition for naturally aspirated 2WD cars.

From 1984 until late 1990s, many privateer teams competed with AE86s in World Rally Championship (WRC) events. Some of them found success by winning their class and sometimes became eligible to score WRC championship points when they finished in the top ten of the overall classifications. The first respectable result was in the 1984 Rally de Portugal, when driver Jorge Ortigão and co-driver João Baptista finished in second place behind the Group A class winner, the Volkswagen Golf GTi (Mk1), and finished in eighth place overall among the more powerful Group B cars. The first class win came three rounds later in the Acropolis Rally, when Manolis Halivelakis and Konstantinos Exarchos finished thirteenth overall. The best result of AE86 in WRC was in the 1989 Rallye Côte d'Ivoire when Adolphe Choteau and Jean-Pierre Claverie finished third overall.

The AE86 competed in the Division 1 European Touring Car Championship (ETCC) from 1984 to 1988, where its main rivals were the Volkswagen Golf GTi (Mk2) and Audi 80 GLE. In 1986 it beat the Division 2 BMW 325i (E30) and Division 3 BMW 635i CSi to win the Manufacturers Championship with 267 points.

In 1986 and 1987, Chris Hodgetts won the British Touring Car Championship (BTCC), beating the V8 Rover SD1's, Ford Sierra Cosworth's and BMW 3 Series (E30) M3's two years running for an overall points victory driving an AE86 for Toyota (GB) PLC and his own race prep team CHMS.

Five different teams won eight of eleven races in Division 1 class in the 1987 World Touring Car Championship (WTCC). However, none of these teams were eligible to score championship points. The Corolla GT also successfully dominated its class in European endurance races like the Spa 24 Hours and Nürburgring 24 Hours throughout the 1980s.

From 1985 to 1988, the Corolla Levin participated in Division 1 of the All Japan Touring Car Championship (JTC). Kaoru Hoshino, from the Trampio Levin team, won the 1985 Division 1 class championship and placed third overall with two wins and two second-place finishes. In the following seasons, the AE86 faced a fierce battle from the Civic Si and was also overshadowed by the more competitive front-wheel drive AE82 Corolla FX-GT. The semi-factory supported Kraft team entered a spaceframe Trueno in the JGTC for the GT300 regulations in 1999. The Trueno used a Dallara F3 chassis and was powered with a 3S-GTE engine that came from a SW20 MR2 Turbo that produces about 300 hp (224 kW). Despite being popular with the fans, the car had minor success and was abandoned from use halfway through the 2001 season when the AE86 burst into flames during the third round of the season at Sugo. Kraft subsequently replaced it with the newly-delivered Toyota MR-S.

The Toyota Team Australia (TAA)-prepared AE86s dominated the under 2.0 L class in the Australian Touring Car Championship, the Australian Endurance Championship, and the Australian 2.0 Litre Touring Car Championship from 1985 to 1986. TTA secured five class titles across those championships: four by John Smith and one by Mike Quinn in the 1986 Australian Endurance Championship. The AE86 was also highly successful at the Bathurst 1000, although its victories were mostly against other AE86s and the front-wheel drive AE82. The TTA AE86s secured class victories in 1985, 1986 and 1988. Following their success, privateer teams running the local market Sprinter liftback model also achieved victories: Bob Holden Motors won in 1987, Phoenix Motorsport in 1990, and Speedtech Motorsport in 1991.

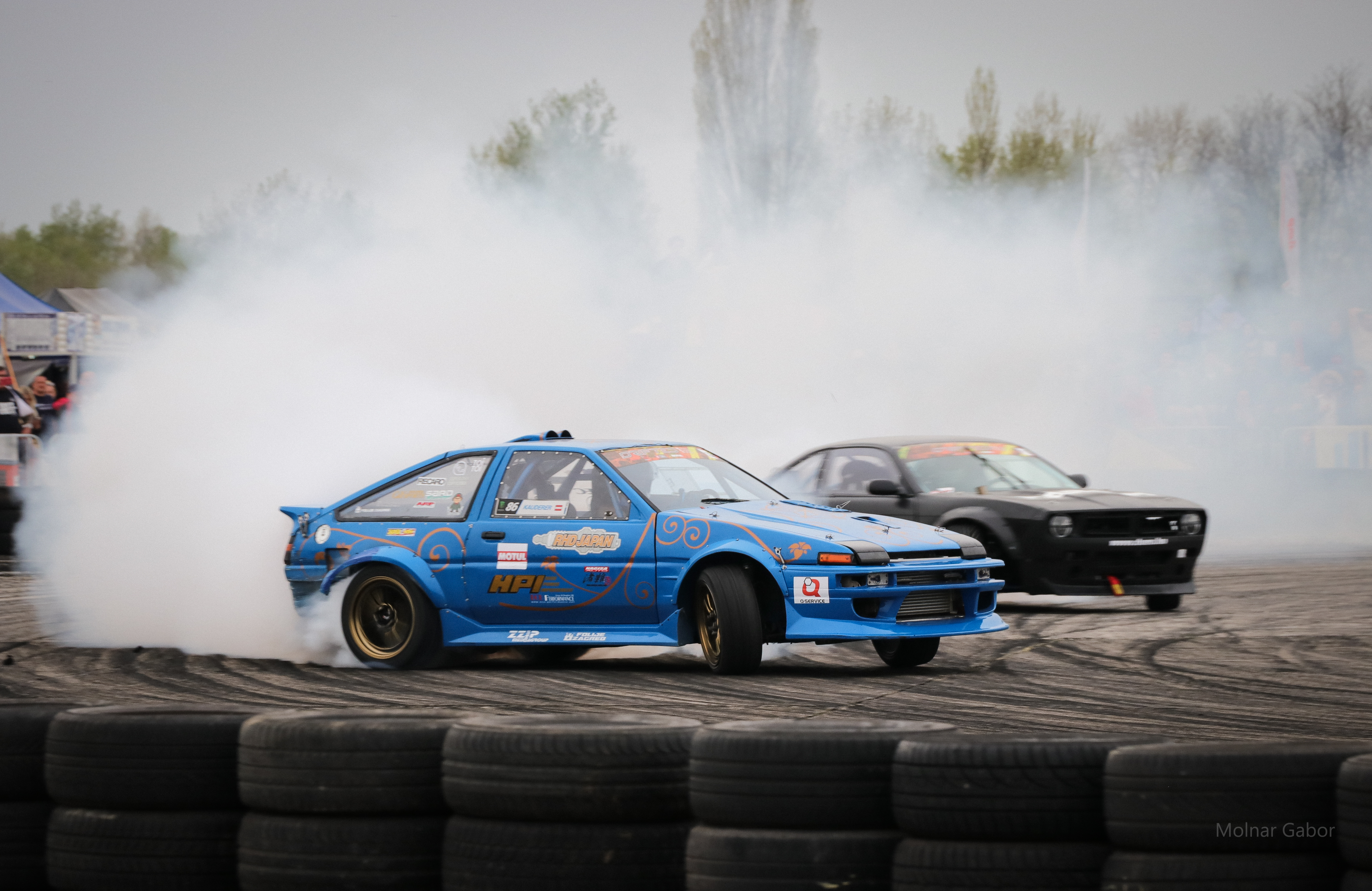
An AE86 in a drift event

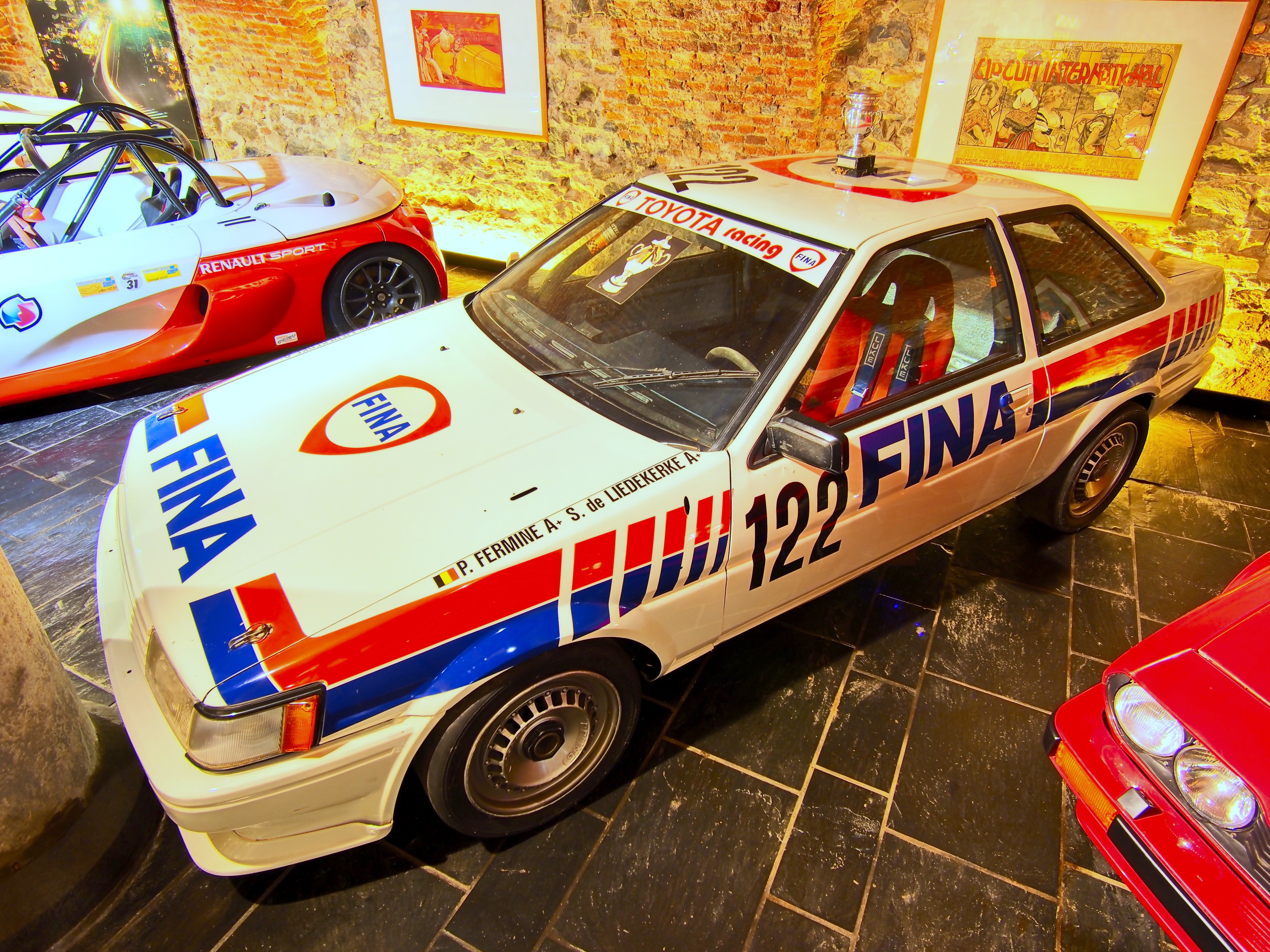
1985 ETCC Corolla GT race car at the Spa-Francorchamps Racing Museum

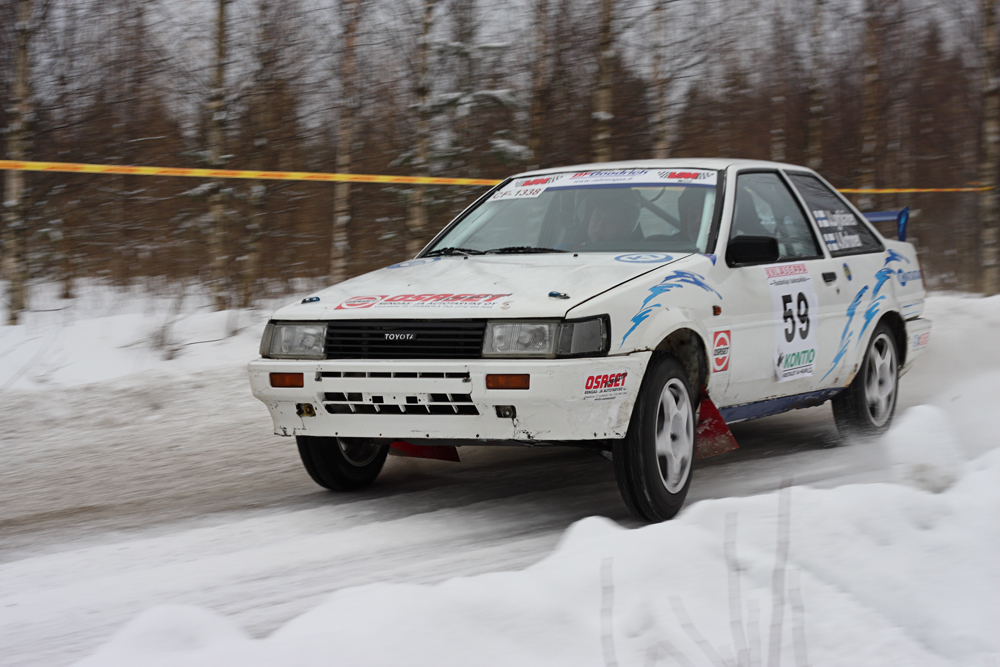
A Corolla GT rally car in Finland

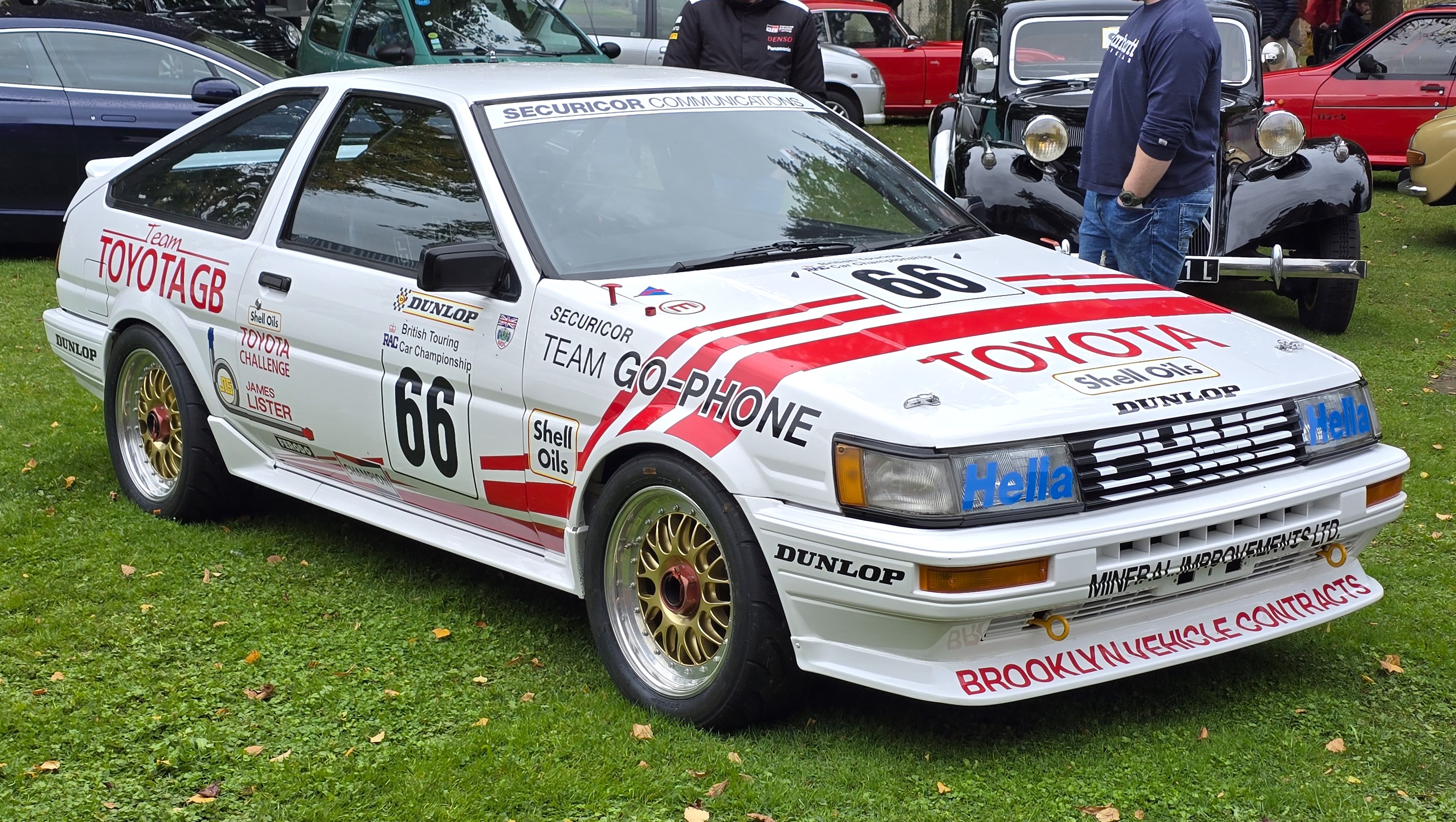
A replica of Chris Hodgetts' BTCC-winning Corolla GT made by Toyota UK

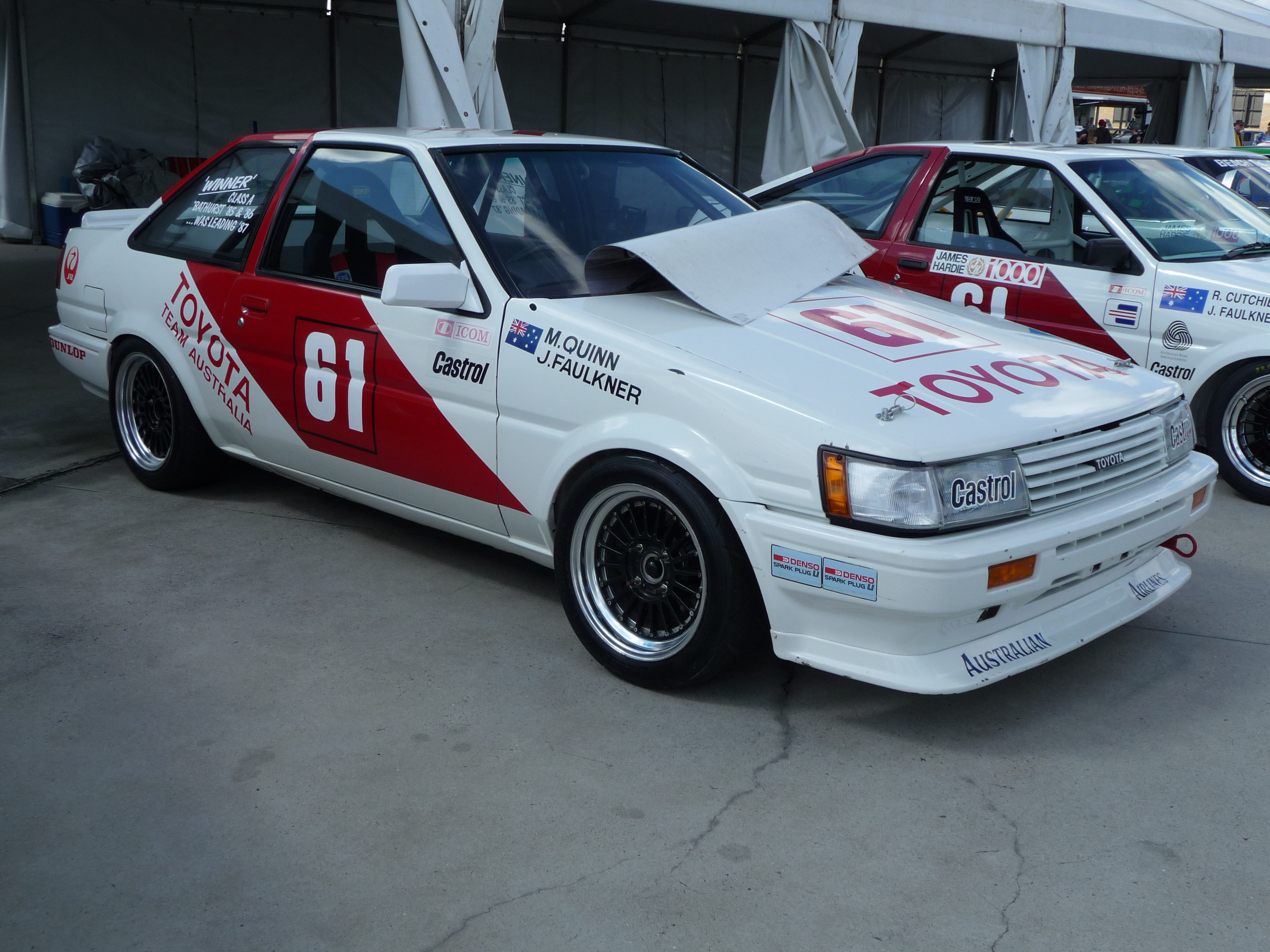
Toyota Team Australia's Class A 1986 Bathurst 1000 winner, driven by Mike Quinn and John Faulkner.

The rear wheel drive configuration, combined with the AE86's light weight (approximately 2300 lb (950–970 kg) curb weight), balance and relatively powerful (and easy to tune) 4A-GEU engine made it popular among the Japanese hashiriya (street racers in Japanese), many of whom raced in touge (mountain passes in Japanese) where the corners suited the AE86 best, especially on the downhill. Among those who utilized this car was Japanese racing legend Keiichi Tsuchiya also known as the Drift King ("Dori-Kin" in Japanese). Tsuchiya who also drove the AE86 Levin in the JTC, helped popularize the sport of drifting, which involves taking a car on a set of controlled slides through corners. The AE86's FR configuration made it well suited to this kind of cornering, and currently the car is a mainstay of drift shows and competitions. Japanese drifters like Katsuhiro Ueo (champion of 2002 D1 Grand Prix series with AE86), Toshiki Yoshioka, Youichi Imamura, Kouichi Yamashita, Hiroshi Takahashi, Tetsuya Hibino, and Wataru Hayashi were also involved in making the AE86 famous in the drift scene. AE86s around the world have been extensively modified for use in professional drifting. The AE86 is also a popular choice for autocross, gymkhana, time attack, rallycross, and hillclimbing events.

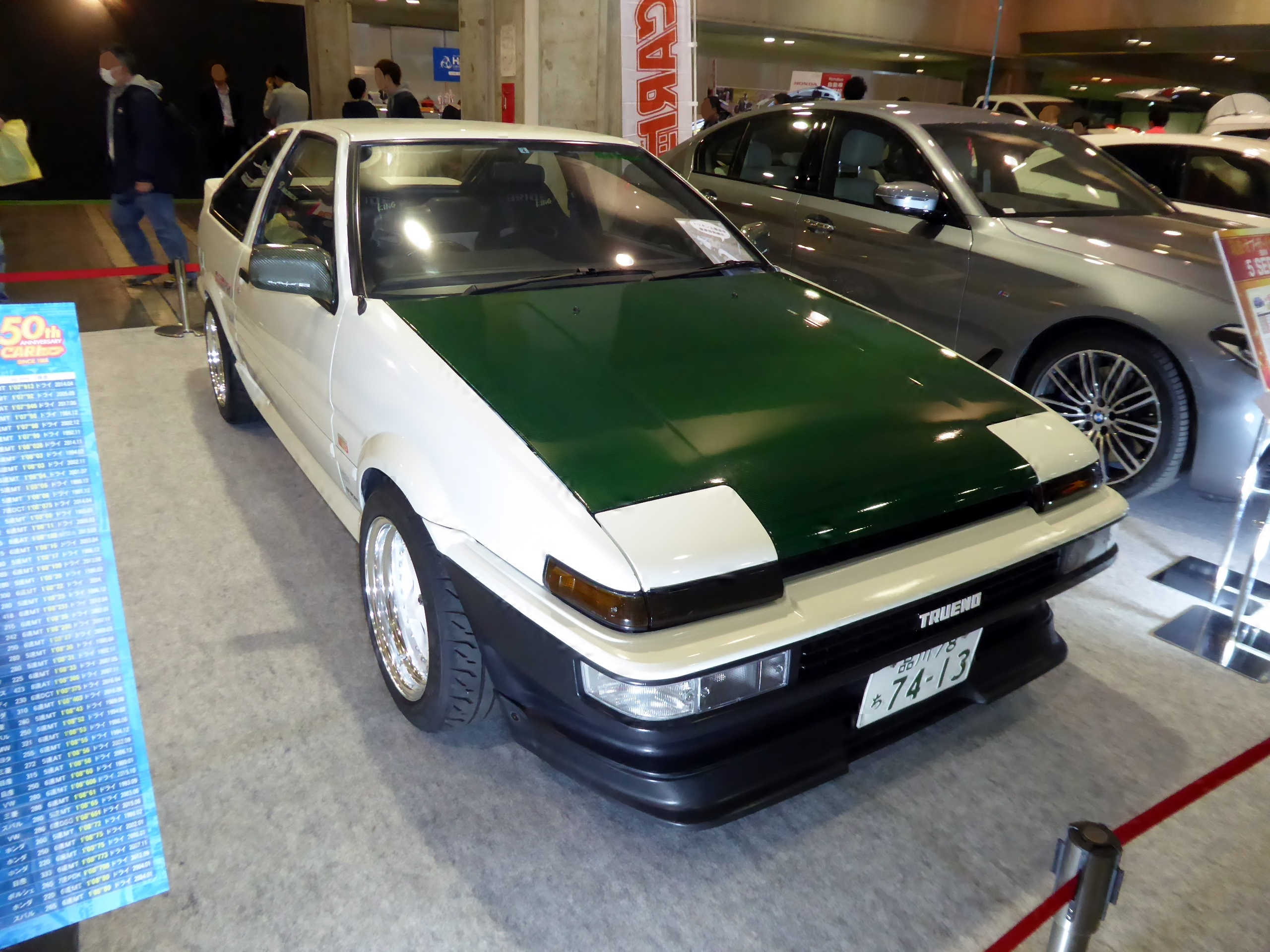
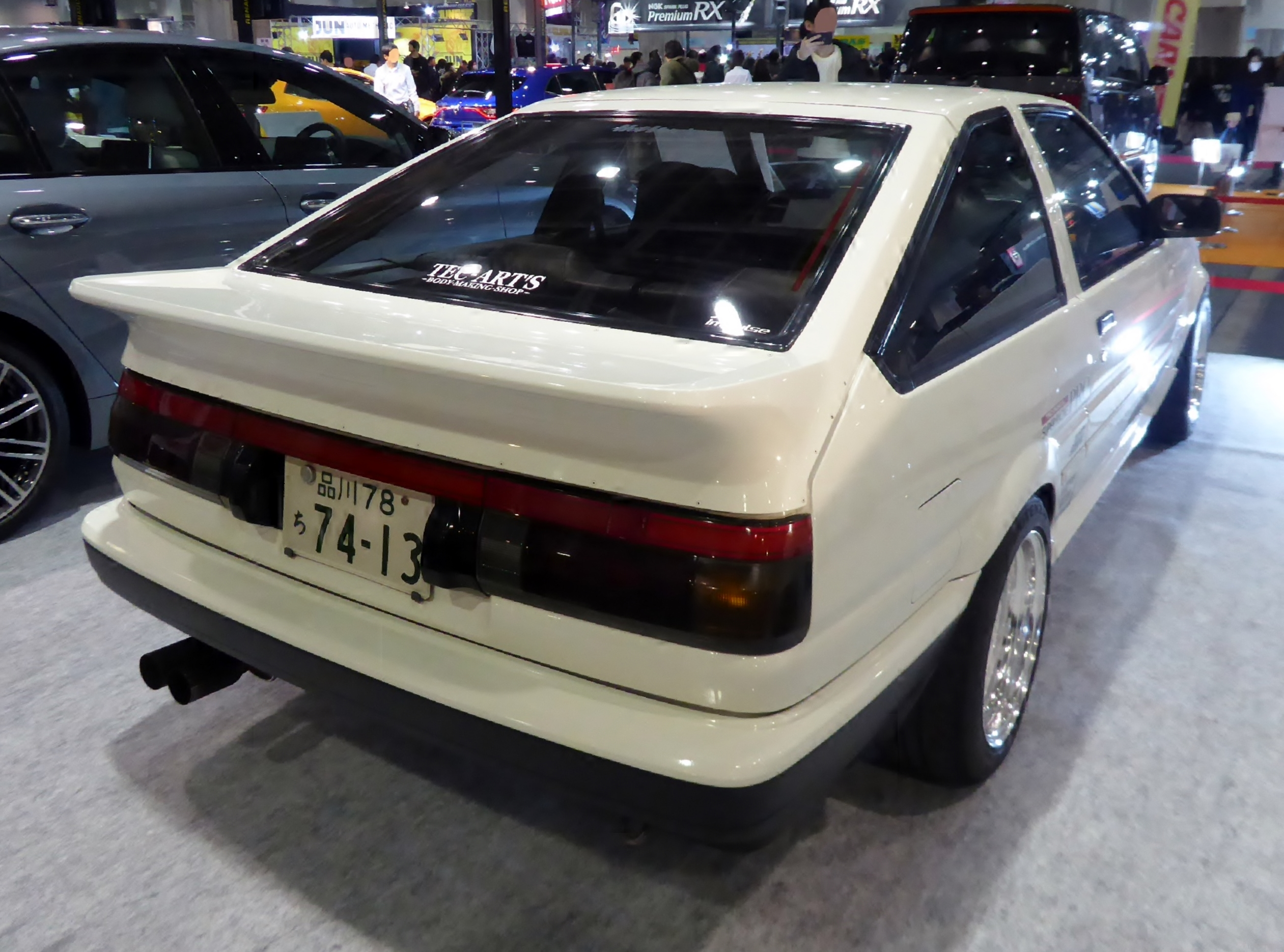
Keiichi Tsuchiya's AE86 Sprinter Trueno GTV

== In popular culture ==
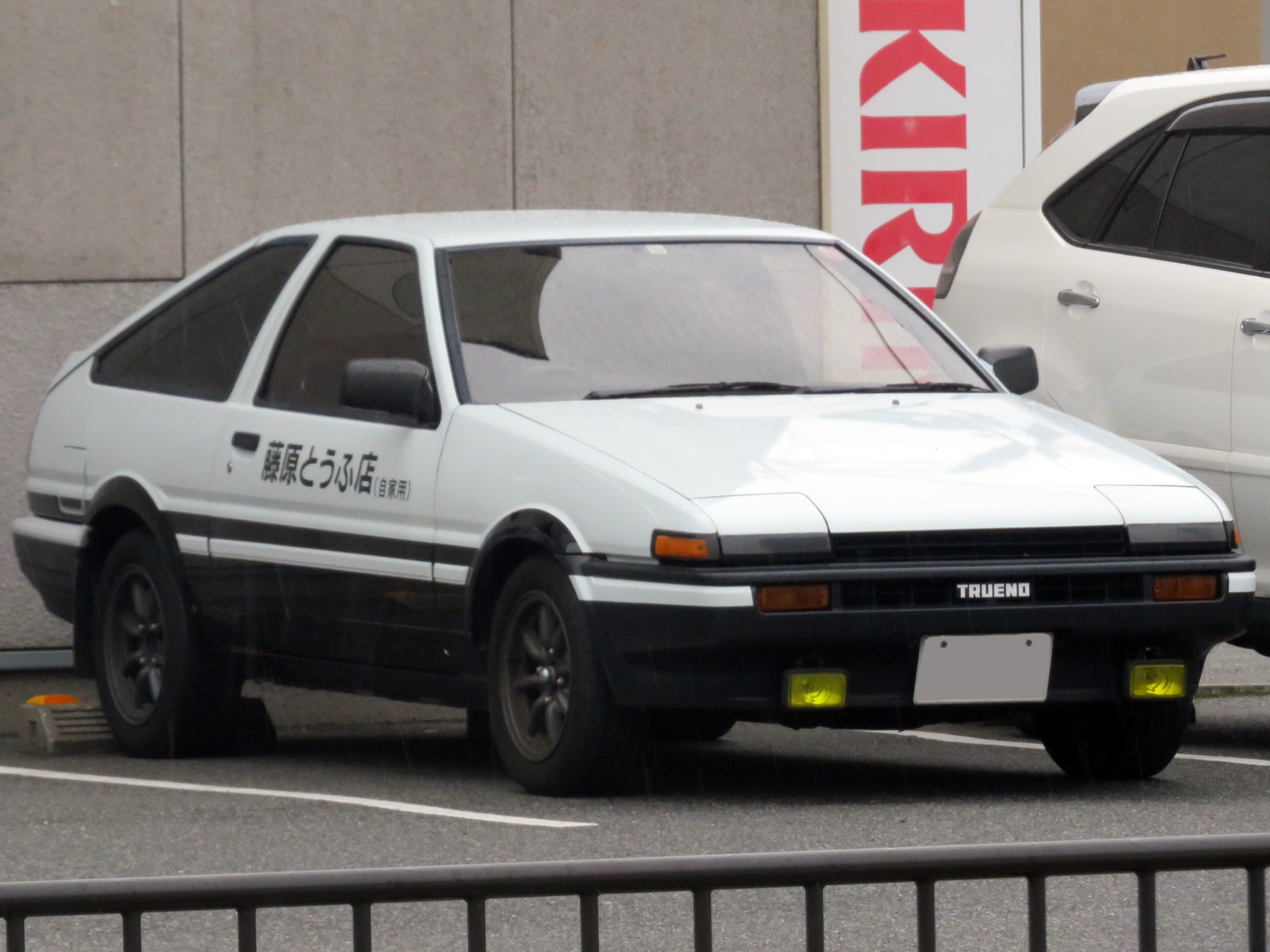
Initial D AE86 replica

The AE86 is considered as a cultural icon in Japanese popular culture following its inclusion in the Initial D anime and manga. The main character, Takumi Fujiwara, uses his father's AE86 Trueno GT APEX liftback to make his tofu deliveries and later for racing. His friend, Itsuki Takeuchi, drives an AE85 Levin SR liftback. Throughout the series, two of Takumi's opponents drive AE86s: Wataru Akiyama, who drives a turbocharged (later supercharged) AE86 Levin GT APEX liftback, and Shinji Inui, who drives the notchback coupé version of the GT APEX AE86 Trueno. The AE86 is also a playable vehicle in the Initial D Arcade Stage series. The popularity of Initial D is cited as the main cause of the car's high resale price, which is often referred to as "Takumi tax" or "tofu tax", after Takumi and his tofu delivery occupation respectively.

== Production ==
The Toyota AE86 (as well as the AE85) was built in either the Kanto Higashi-Fuji plant, or the Takaoka plant. Over 360,000 AE86s are estimated to have been built in total.

AE86s built at the (now-closed) Kanto Higashi-Fuji plant came with a "5" designation at the beginning of the serial number. Their plant codes were "M21" and "M22". Only 28% of AE86s were produced at this plant, all of them being made for Japan with no export models being made.

AE86s built at the Takaoka plant came with a "0" designation at the beginning of the serial number. Their plant codes were "A54" and "A52". The majority of AE86s were produced at this plant (including exported AE86 models), as it was the original plant where the Toyota Corolla and Sprinter are manufactured.
