= Lexus IS =

Compact executive car

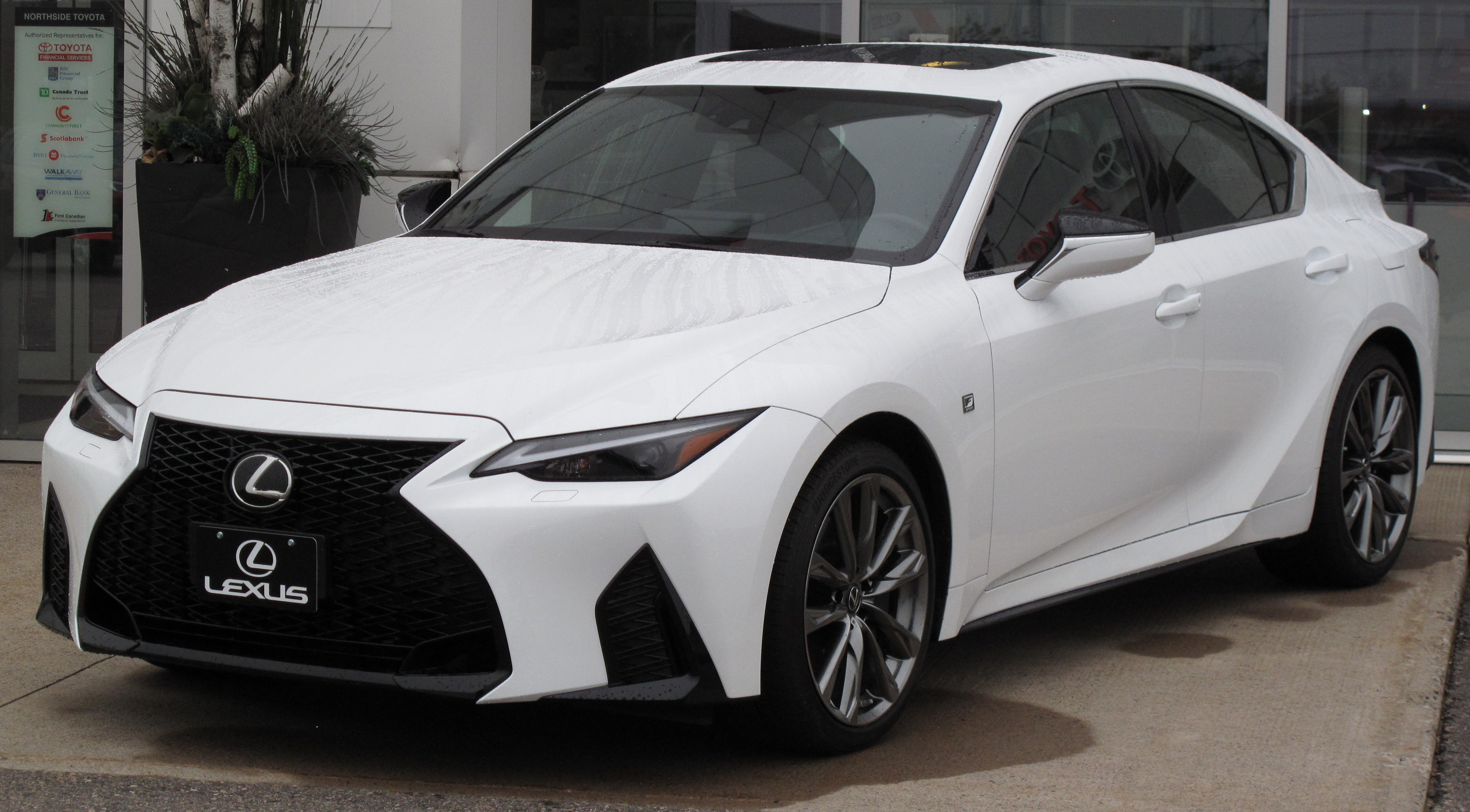
- 2021 Lexus IS 300 F Sport (ASE30, Canada)

Overview
- Manufacturer: Toyota
- Also called: Toyota Altezza (Japan, 1998–2005)
- Production: October 1998 – present
- Model years: 1999–present

Body and chassis
- Class: Compact executive car (D)
- Layout: Front-engine, rear-wheel-drive; Front-engine, all-wheel-drive

Chronology
- Predecessor: Lexus GS 460/F (for IS 500 F Sport Performance)

The Lexus IS (Japanese: レクサス・IS, Hepburn: Rekusasu IS) is a compact executive car (D-segment in Europe) sold by Lexus, a luxury division of Toyota, since 1998. The IS was originally sold under the Toyota Altezza (Japanese: トヨタ・アルテッツァ, Hepburn: Toyota Arutettsua) nameplate in Japan from 1998 until 2005 (the word Altezza is Italian for 'height' or 'highness'). The IS was introduced as an entry-level sport model positioned below the ES in the Lexus lineup. It was the smallest car in the Lexus lineup until the introduction of the CT in 2011.

The first-generation Altezza (codename XE10) was launched in Japan in October 1998, while the Lexus IS 200 (GXE10) made its debut in Europe in 1999 and in North America as the IS 300 (JCE10) in 2000. The first-generation models were powered by a straight-six engine and available in sedan and wagon variants. The second-generation IS (codename XE20) was launched globally in 2005 with V6-powered IS 250 (GSE20) and IS 350 (GSE21) and Diesel-powered IS 200d/220d (ALE20) sedan models, followed by a high-performance V8 sedan version, the IS F, in 2007, and coupé convertible versions, the IS 250 C and IS 350 C, in 2008. The third-generation Lexus IS premiered in January 2013 and includes the V6-powered IS 250 and IS 350, turbocharged IS 200t/300, hybrid IS 300h and performance-tuned F Sport variants. The IS designation stands for "Intelligent Sport".

== First generation (XE10; 1998) ==
First generation
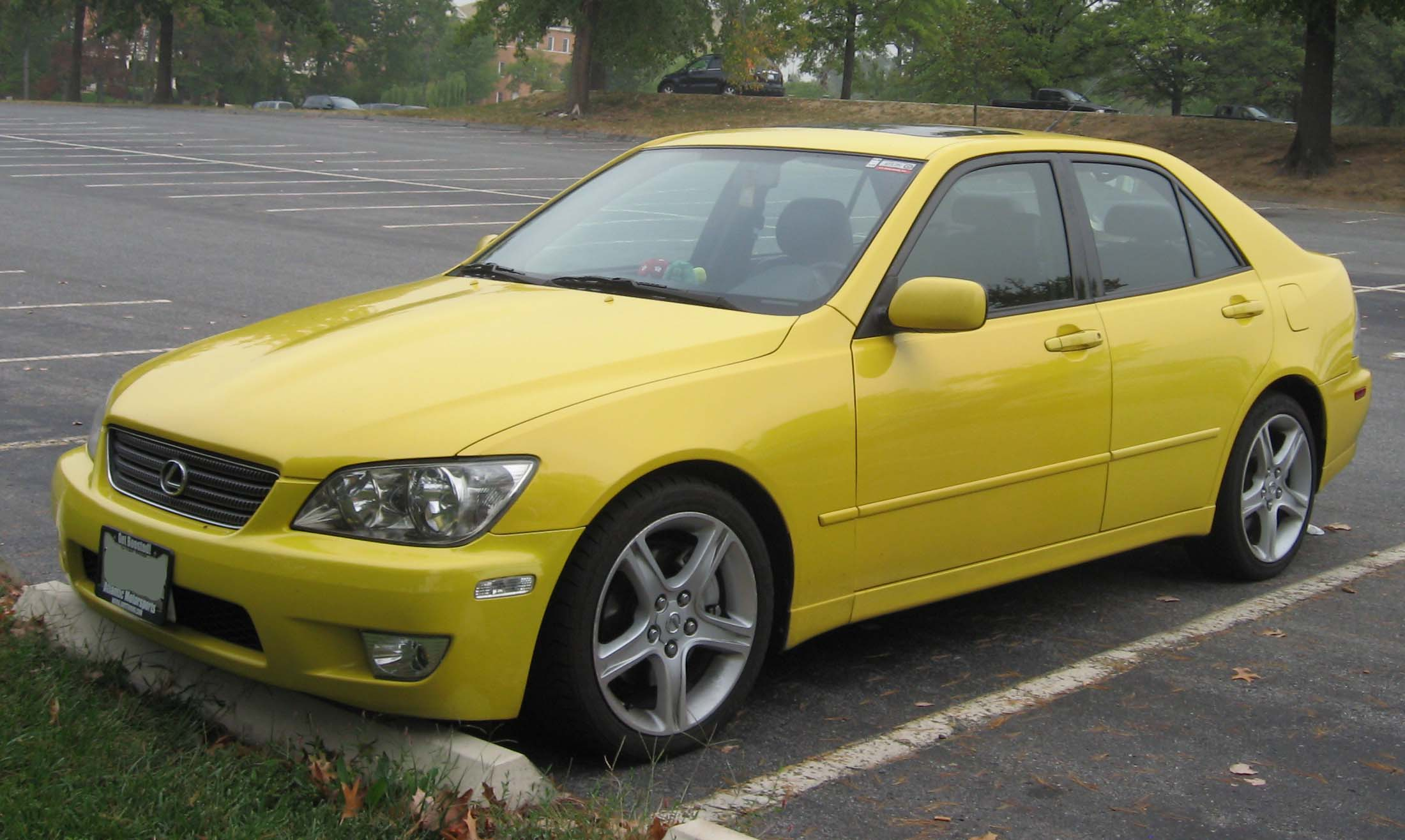
- Lexus IS 300 (JCE10, US)

Overview
- Model code: XE10
- Also called: Toyota Altezza (Japan)
- Production: October 1998 – August 2005 (Altezza); January 1999 – August 2005 (IS)
- Model years: 1999–2005
- Assembly: Japan: Kanegasaki, Iwate (Kanto Auto Works)
- Designer: Tomoyasu Nishi (exterior: 1995); 2003 facelift: Hiroyuki Tada (2002)

Body and chassis
- Body style: 4-door sedan; 5-door hatchback/station wagon
- Related: Toyota Mark II (X110)

Powertrain
- Engine: Petrol: 2.0 L 3S-GE I4 (SXE10; RS200); 2.0 L 1G-FE I6 (GXE10/15; IS 200/AS200); 3.0 L 2JZ-GE I6 (JCE10/15; IS 300/AS300)
- Transmission: 5-speed W55 manual; 6-speed J160 manual; 4-speed A47DE/A340H automatic; 5-speed A650E automatic

Dimensions
- Wheelbase: 2,670 mm (105.1 in)
- Length: Sedan: 4,400 mm (173.2 in); SportCross/Gita: 4,415 mm (173.8 in)
- Width: Sedan: 1,720 mm (67.7 in); SportCross/Gita: 1,725 mm (67.9 in)
- Height: 1,410–1,440 mm (55.5–56.7 in)
- Kerb weight: IS 200: 1,360 kg (2,998 lb); IS 200 SportCross: 1,430 kg (3,153 lb); IS 300 5-Speed: 1,476 kg (3,255 lb); IS 300 E-Shift: 1,490 kg (3,285 lb); IS 300 SportCross: 1,547 kg (3,410 lb)

Produced as a direct competitor to the luxury sports sedans of the leading European luxury marques, the XE10 series Toyota Altezza and Lexus IS were designed with greater performance emphasis than typically seen on prior Japanese luxury vehicles. The engineering work was led by Nobuaki Katayama from 1994 to 1998 under the 038T program code. Design work which had been done in 1995 by Tomoyasu Nishi was frozen in 1996 and filed under patent number 1030135 on 5 December 1996, at the Japan Patent Office. At its introduction to Japan, it was exclusive to Japanese dealerships called Toyota Netz Store, until Lexus was introduced to Japan in 2006. The Japanese-market AS200 Altezza sedan and AS300 Altezza Gita correspond to the Lexus IS 200 and IS 300 models respectively, as sold in markets outside of Japan. The Lexus IS' primary markets were North America, Australia, and Europe. The Altezza Gita was a hatchback-station wagon version sold in Japan and was known in the US and Europe as the Lexus IS SportCross. The AS300 Altezza Gita was the only Altezza with the 2JZ-GE engine; in export markets this engine was available in both the sedan and SportCross models as well.

=== 1998–2000 ===
Introduced in 1998 with the AS200 (chassis code GXE10) and RS200 (chassis code SXE10) sedans, the compact vehicle was produced using a shortened, front-engine, rear-wheel-drive midsize platform, allowing Japanese buyers to take advantage of tax savings imposed by Japanese government regulations concerning vehicle engine displacement (but not exterior dimensions, as the car was 20 mm wider than the 1,700 mm standard), and adapted parts from the larger second-generation Aristo/GS. The 2.0-litre 1G-FE straight-six powered AS200 (GXE10, sedan) was equipped with a four-speed automatic as standard. The 2.0-litre 3S-GE straight-four-powered RS200 (SXE10, sedan) was equipped a six-speed manual transmission, while a five-speed automatic was optional.

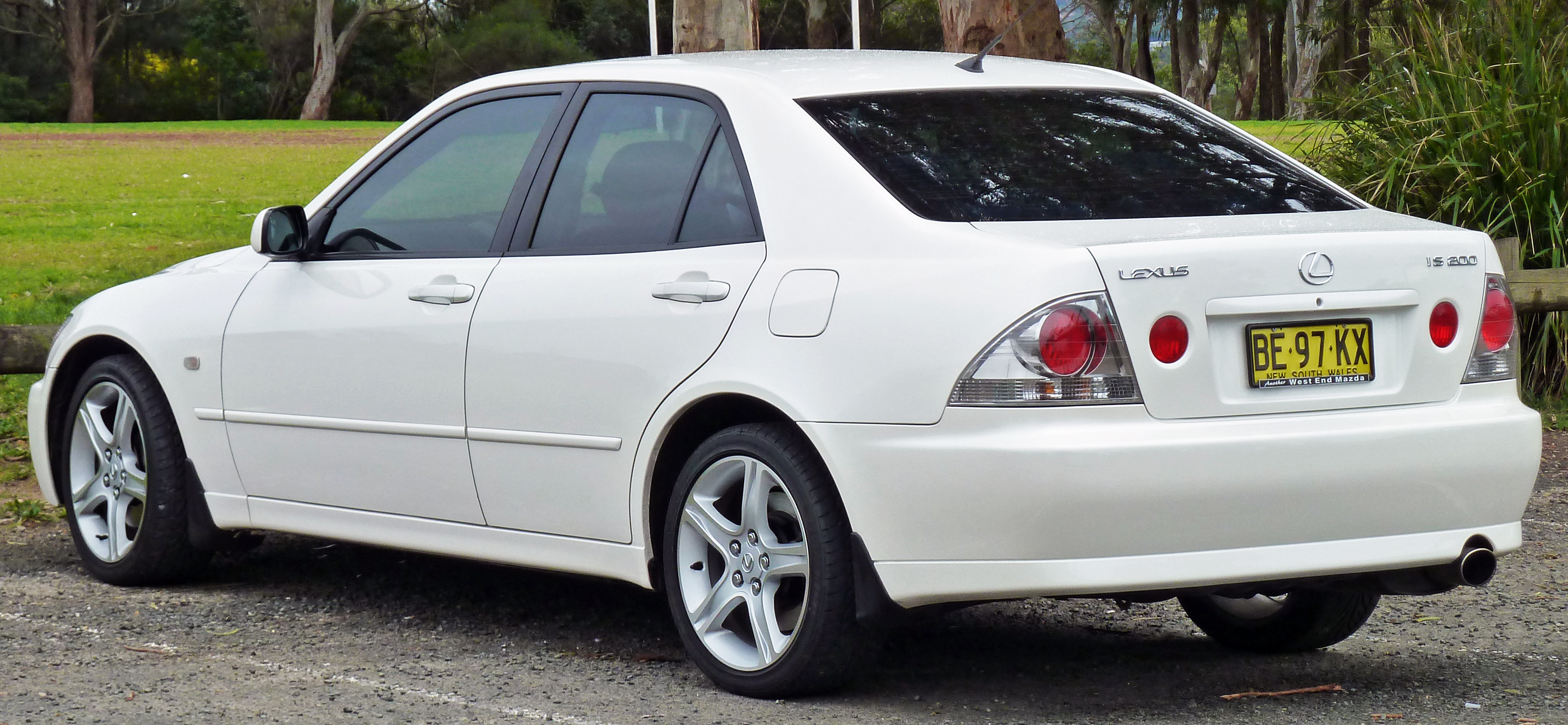
1999–2005 Lexus IS 200 sedan (GXE10, Australia)

The design received critical acclaim at its 1998 launch and was awarded Japan's "Car of the Year" honor for 1998–1999. A few months later, Lexus began marketing the IS 200 equivalent models in Europe. The IS 200 in Europe was rated at 153 hp (114 kW), with a top speed of 216 km/h (134 mph), and 0 to 100 km/h (0–62 mph) acceleration time of 9.3 seconds. The styling cues of the rear lamp clusters on the first-generation models were copied by a number of after-market accessory manufacturers for applications on other vehicles. This iconic style of one or more internal lamp units, covered with a clear (or tinted) perspex cover made popular by Lexus, became known in many circles as 'Lexus-style' or 'Altezza lights'. The taillight style became so popular, that it influenced the development of clear-covered LED taillamps that only revealed their colour when illuminated. The XE10's chief engineer was Nobuaki Katayama, while the chief test driver and test engineer was Hiromu Naruse.

=== 2001–2003 ===
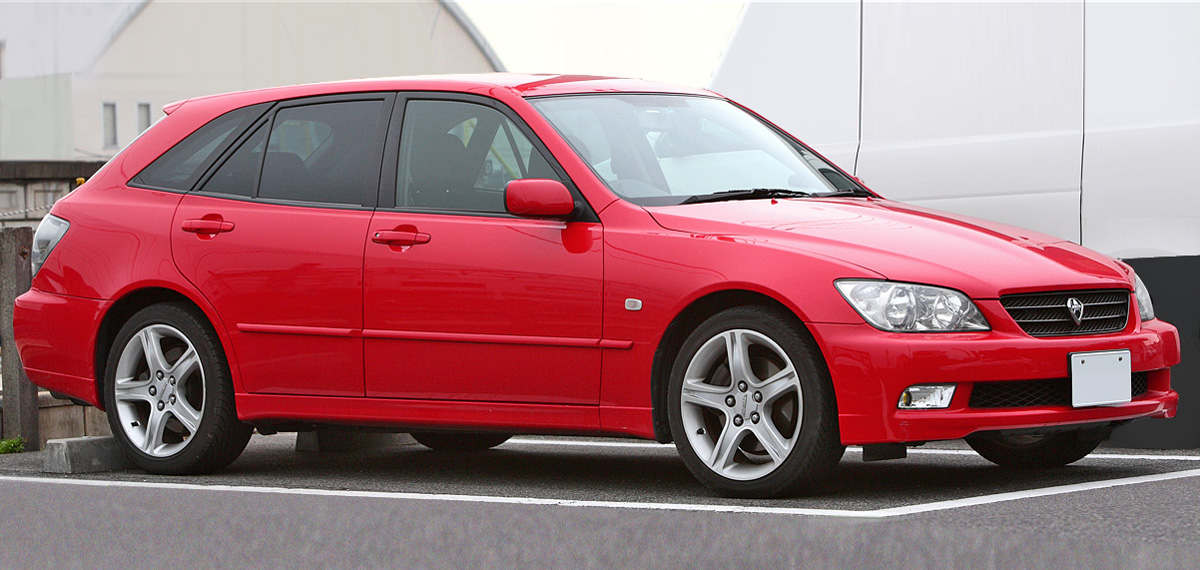
Toyota Altezza Gita AS300 (JCE10W, Japan)

In July 2001, a hatchback/station wagon model, the AS300 (chassis code JCE10W), was introduced featuring a 3.0-litre 2JZ-GE straight-six engine. Equipped with rear- or all-wheel drive (JCE10W, RWD Gita wagon; JCE15W, 4WD Gita wagon), the AS300 was only available with an automatic gearbox; a five-speed automatic for the RWD Gita wagon and a four-speed automatic for the 4WD Gita wagon. The six-cylinder version (2JZ-GE) was only available on the Gita models in Japan. Additionally, a six-speed manual transmission was introduced to the AS200 as an option (chassis code GXE10W), as well as an all-wheel drive version (chassis code GXE15W) in January 2002. In the US, the IS 300 sedan debuted in July 2000 as 2001 model and the wagon debuted in 2001 as a 2002 model with the same 3.0-litre six-cylinder engine (the 2.0-litre six-cylinder was not available), while in Europe, the IS 300 joined the IS 200 in the model lineup. The IS 300 models were initially only available with the five-speed automatic transmission in all markets. A five-speed manual – the six-speed manual from the 2-litre model was not designed for the torque put out by the larger 2JZ-GE engine – was made available in the US in 2001 for the 2002 model year. The manual option was not available on the SportCross wagon. Lexus aimed for 15 percent of American IS 300 sales to be manuals. Visually, the exterior of the European IS 200 Sport and 300 were almost identical, the only differences being the boot insignia and the larger-engined model initially having clear front indicators (later generalized throughout the range).

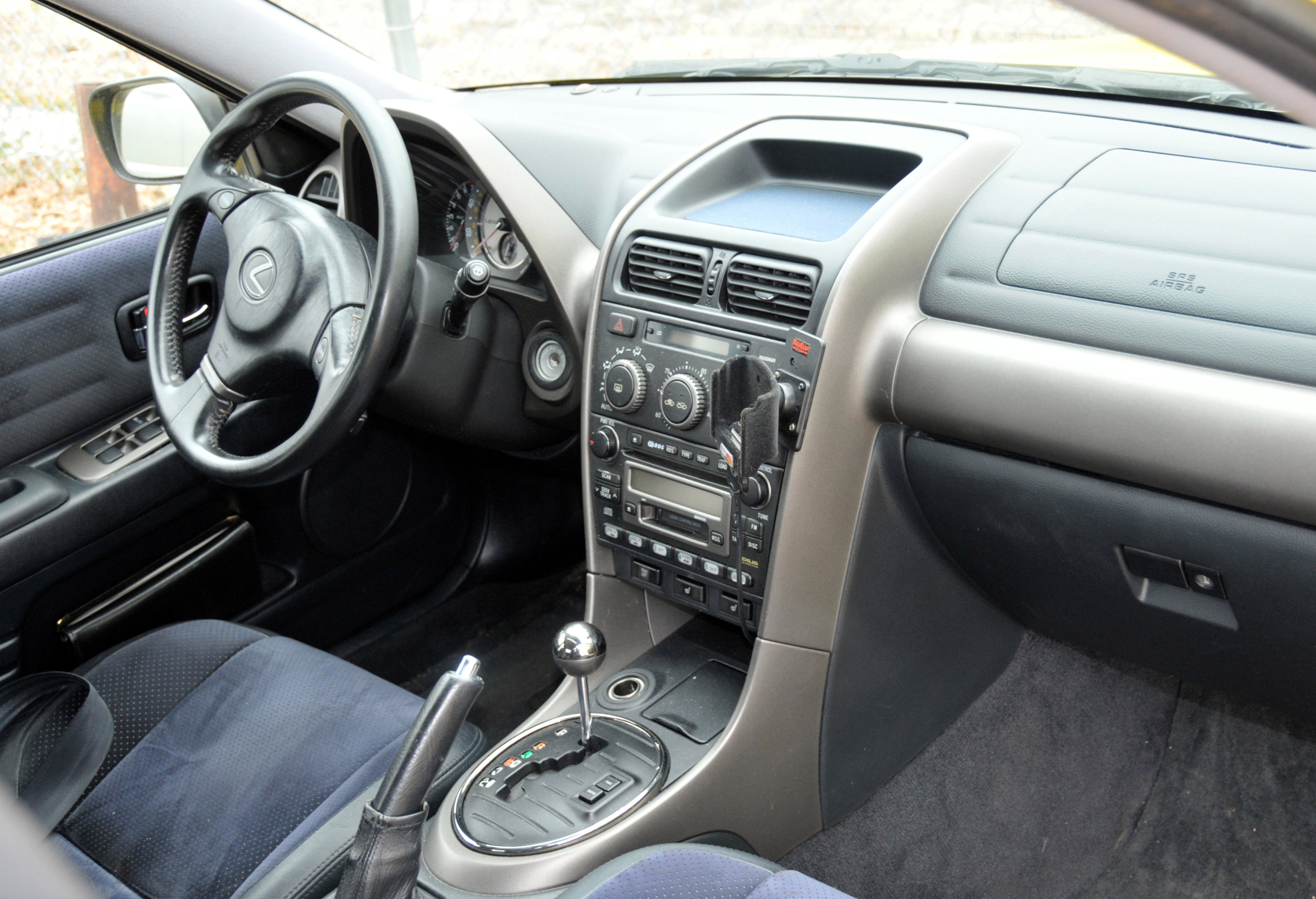
Interior of Lexus IS 300

The first-generation IS' interior featured unique elements not typically found in other Lexus models. These included a chrome metal ball shifter (USDM & European market, other markets received an optional leather-trimmed shifter), (optional) pop-up navigation screen, and chronograph-style instrument panel (with mini gauges for temperature, fuel economy, and volts). For the European and Australian markets, the IS 300 gained full leather seats rather than the leather/Ecsaine of the 200, plus auto-dimming rear view and side mirrors, and HID headlamps. In the US, the Environmental Protection Agency listed the IS 300 as a subcompact car; although it technically had enough overall volume to be called a compact, rear seat room exhibited subcompact dimensions.

The US National Highway Traffic Safety Administration (NHTSA) crash test results in 2001 gave the IS 300 the maximum five stars in the Side Driver and Side Rear Passenger categories, and four stars in the Frontal Driver and Frontal Passenger categories. The Insurance Institute for Highway Safety (IIHS) rated the IS "Good" overall for frontal collisions and "Good" in all six measured front impact categories.

For the first-generation IS in the North American market, sales hit a high of 22,486 units in 2001; subsequent sales years were less than forecast, and below the 10,000-unit mark in 2004. The IS 200 fared better relative to sales targets in Europe and Asia, while still well short of the sales volume achieved by the Mercedes-Benz C-Class and other, mostly German-made competitors. This trend was indicative of Lexus' smaller global status; while Lexus' range of cars was very successful in North America, the marque's sales lagged behind its German rivals in Europe. In Europe, the lack of a manual gearbox option for the IS 300 may have limited sales in contrast to its rivals, the BMW 3 Series and the Mercedes C-Class.

In 2000, TTE introduced a compressor kit for the IS 200 in the European market. An Eaton supercharger at 0.3-bar pressure increased the power output to 153 kW (205 hp) without sacrificing fuel consumption (+3.3%). The kit was initially available as an aftermarket fitment, but could also be obtained as OEM Lexus accessory on newer cars through the official Lexus dealer network and was fully covered by the standard warranty. This variant was discontinued when the IS 300 was introduced in the European market.

=== 2003–2005 ===
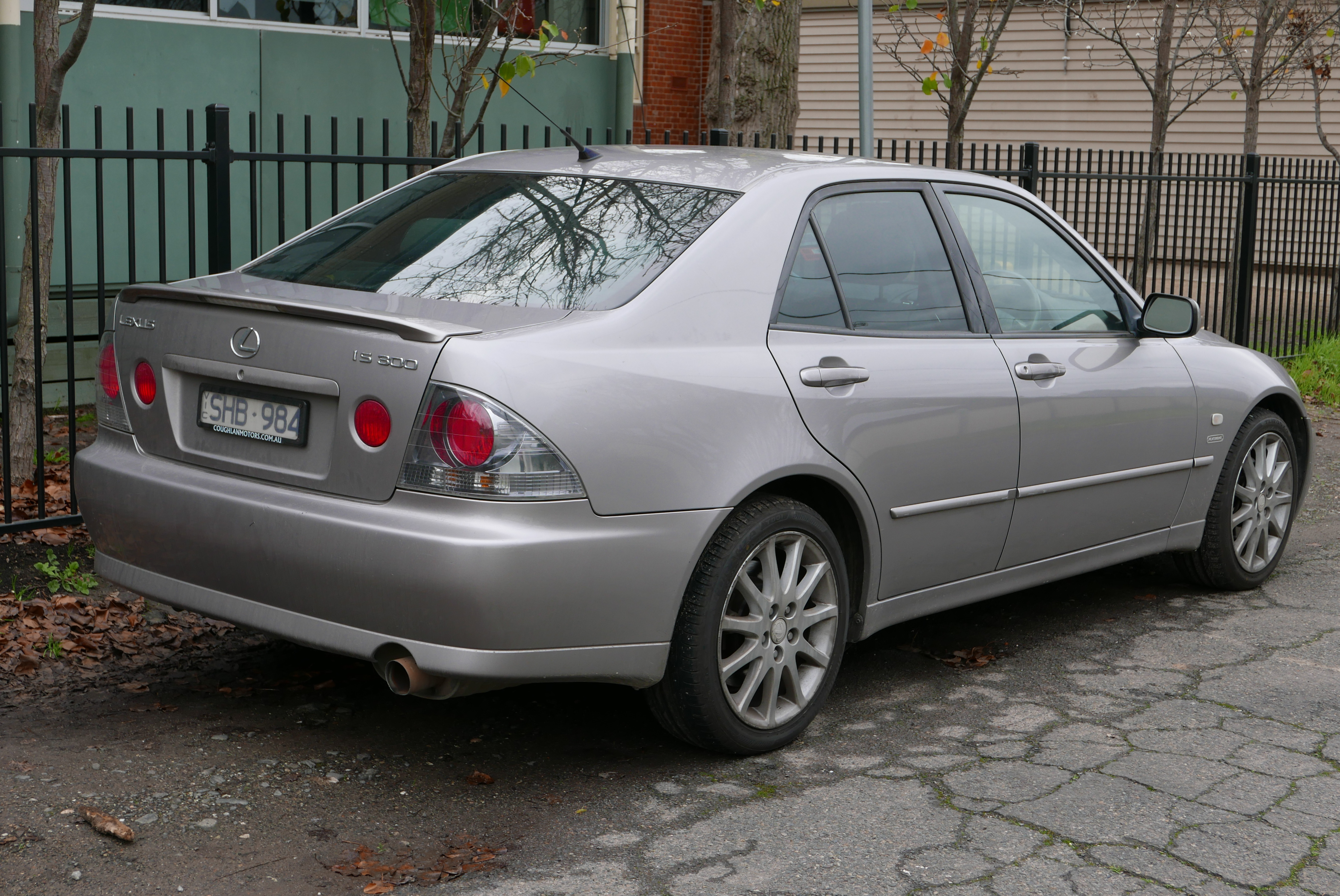
2003 Lexus IS 300 Platinum Edition (JCE10, Australia)

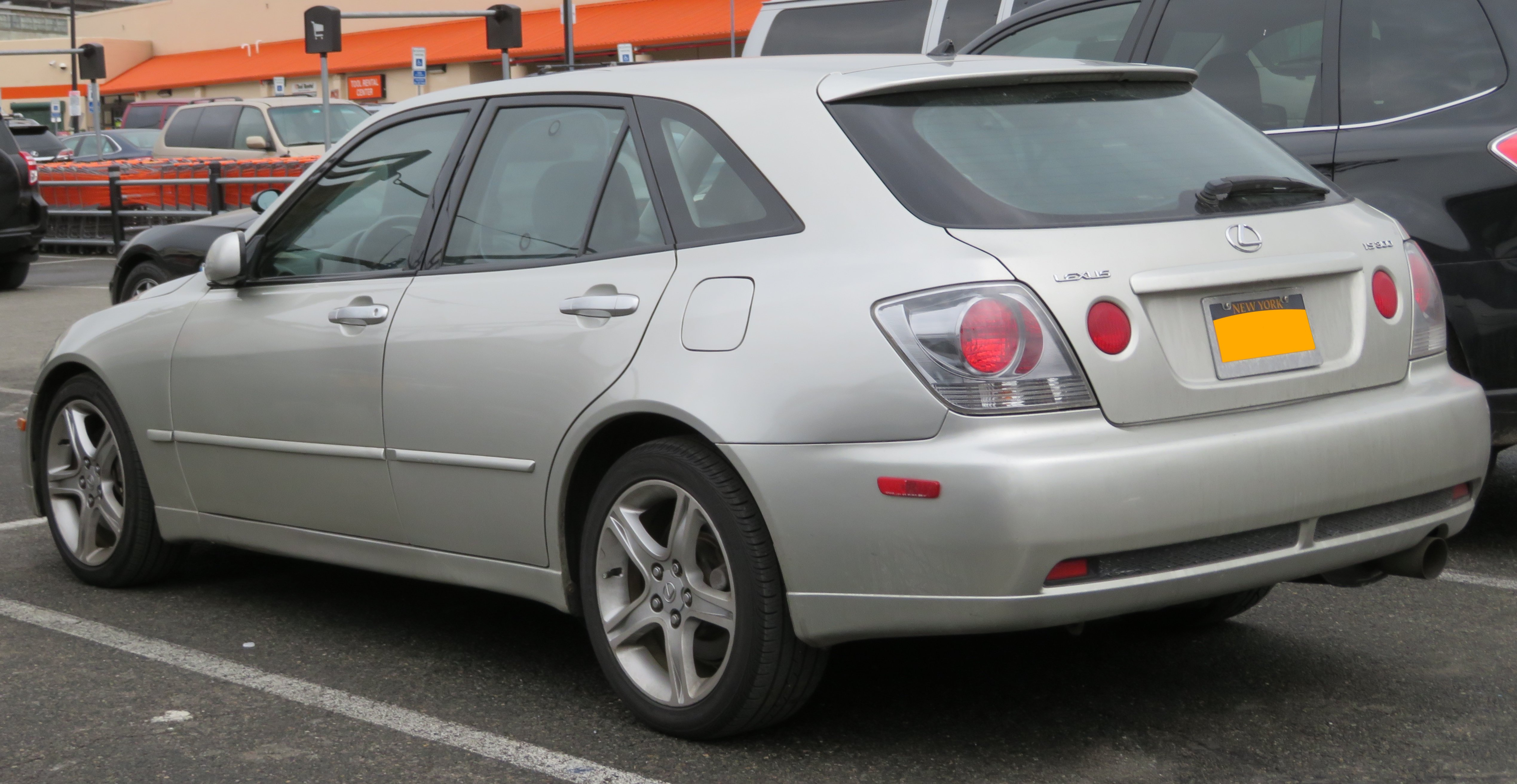
2004 Lexus IS 300 SportCross (JCE10, US)

In 2003 for the 2004 model year, the IS line received a minor facelift (designed by Hiroyuki Tada). On the exterior, was a redesigned 11-spoke wheel design, new headlights with lenses and xenon lamps, redesigned fog lamps, and smoked surrounding trim for the headlamps and taillamps. On the interior, a 2-position memory function was added for the driver seat, a maintenance indicator lamp, automatic drive-away door locking system, a storage compartment on the dash (for models without the navigation system) and updated trim highlights.

An official concept model, the MillenWorks-built Lexus IS 430 was unveiled at the SEMA Show in Las Vegas, Nevada, in 2003. The IS 430 prototype was an IS 300 fitted with a 4.3-litre V8 from the GS 430. Lexus dubbed the IS 430 a one-off with no plans for production. In Europe, Toyota Team Europe (TTE) installed a supercharged 4.3-litre V8 into an IS 300 bodyshell, the result was a 405 PS (298 kW; 399 hp) ECE sedan.

=== Powertrain and models ===
Engine		Lexus			Toyota		
Engine	Power/torque	Model	Chassis code	Drivetrain and transmission	Model	Chassis code	Drivetrain and transmission
2.0 L straight-six (1G-FE)	114 kW (153 hp); 195 N⋅m (144 lb⋅ft) at 4,600 rpm	IS 200 (sedan)	GXE10	RWD; 6-speed manual (J160); 4-speed automatic (A47DE)	Altezza AS200 (sedan)	GXE10	RWD; 6-speed manual (J160); 4-speed automatic (A47DE)
2.0 L straight-six (1G-FE)	114 kW (153 hp); 195 N⋅m (144 lb⋅ft) at 4,600 rpm	IS 200 SportCross (wagon)	GXE10W	RWD; 6-speed manual (J160)	Altezza Gita AS200 (wagon)	GXE10W	RWD; 6-speed manual (J160); 4-speed automatic (A47DE)
2.0 L straight-six (1G-FE)	114 kW (153 hp); 195 N⋅m (144 lb⋅ft) at 4,600 rpm	IS 200 SportCross (wagon)	GXE10W	RWD; 6-speed manual (J160)	Altezza Gita AS200 (wagon)	GXE15W	4WD; 4-speed automatic (A340H)
2.0 L straight-four (3S-GE)	154 kW (207 hp); 216 N⋅m (159 lb⋅ft) at 6,400 rpm	No equivalent			Altezza RS200 (sedan)	SXE10	RWD; 6-speed manual (J160); 5-speed automatic (A650E)
3.0 L straight-six (2JZ-GE)	162 kW (217 hp); 295 N⋅m (218 lb⋅ft) at 3,800 rpm	IS 300 (sedan)	JCE10	RWD; 5-speed manual (W55, US only); 5-speed automatic (A650E)	No equivalent		
3.0 L straight-six (2JZ-GE)	162 kW (217 hp); 295 N⋅m (218 lb⋅ft) at 3,800 rpm	IS 300 SportCross (wagon)	JCE10W	RWD; 5-speed automatic (A650E)	Altezza Gita AS300 (wagon)	JCE10W	RWD; 5-speed automatic (A650E)
3.0 L straight-six (2JZ-GE)	162 kW (217 hp); 295 N⋅m (218 lb⋅ft) at 3,800 rpm	IS 300 SportCross (wagon)	JCE10W	RWD; 5-speed automatic (A650E)	Altezza Gita AS300 (wagon)	JCE15W	4WD; 4-speed automatic (A340H)

== Second generation (XE20; 2005) ==
Second generation
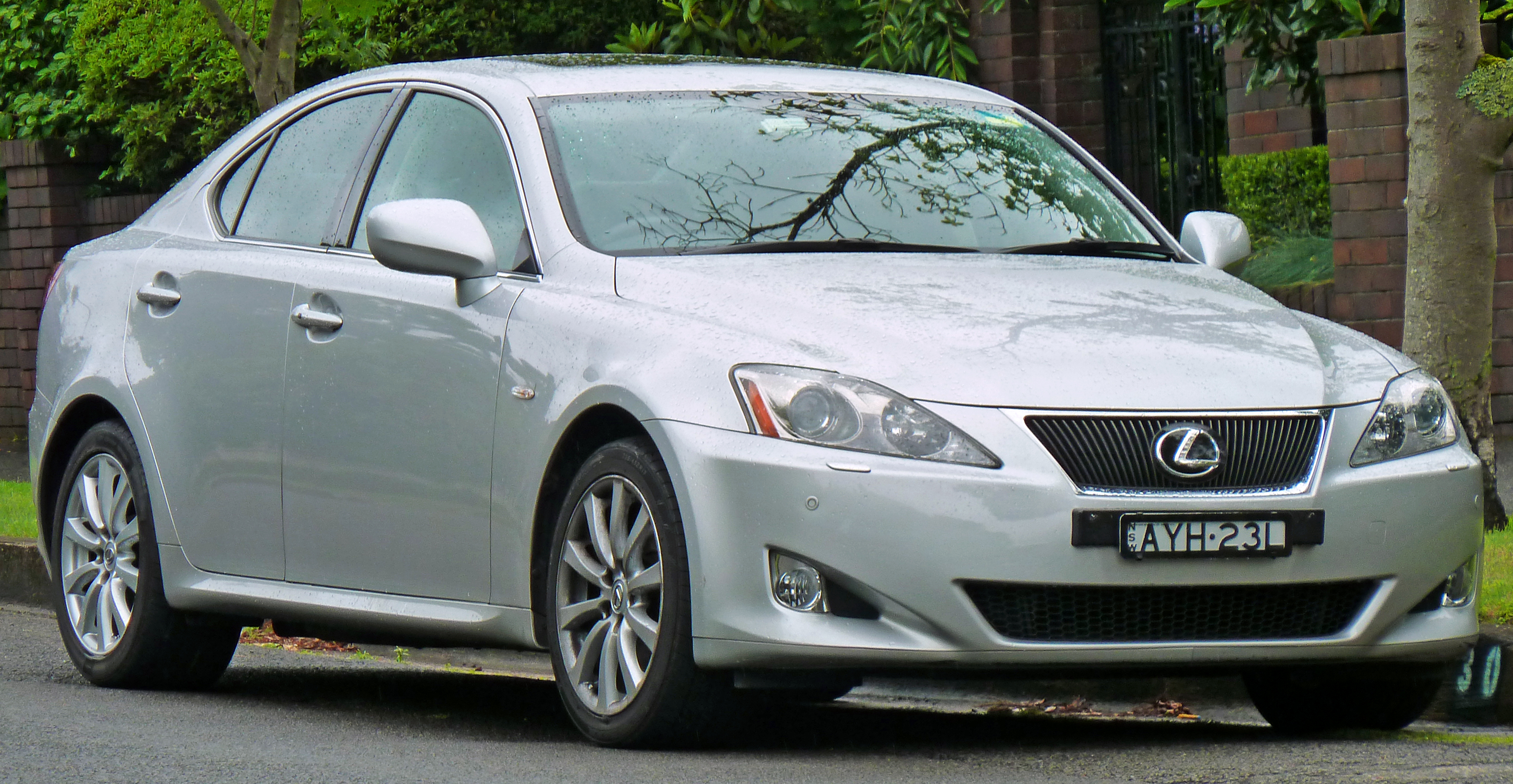
- Lexus IS 250 (pre-facelift; GSE20R)

Overview
- Model code: XE20
- Production: September 2005 – April 2013 (sedan) December 2007 – 2014 (IS F); April 2009 – 2015 (IS C)
- Model years: 2006 – 2013
- Assembly: Japan: Tahara, Aichi (Tahara plant); Japan: Miyawaka, Fukuoka (Toyota Motor Kyushu)
- Designer: Sedan: Kengo Matsumoto, Hiroyuki Tada (2003); IS F: Kengo Matsumoto (chief designer: 2005), Hiroshi Okamoto (exterior: 2005); Cabriolet: Katsuhiro Suzuki (2006, 2007); 2008 facelift: Takahiro Kanno (2007); 2010 facelift: Masanari Sakae (2009)

Body and chassis
- Body style: 4-door sedan; 2-door coupé convertible
- Platform: Toyota N platform

Powertrain
- Engine: Petrol: 2.5 L 4GR-FSE V6 (GSE20/25; IS 250); 3.0 L 3GR-FE V6 (GSE22; IS 300); 3.5 L 2GR-FSE V6 (GSE21/26; IS 350); 5.0 L 2UR-GSE V8 (USE20; IS F); Diesel: 2.2 L 2AD-FHV/2AD-FTV I4-T (ALE20; IS 200d/220d)
- Transmission: 6-speed RA62/RA63 manual; 6-speed A760E/A760H/A960E automatic; 8-speed AA80E automatic (IS F)

Dimensions
- Wheelbase: 2,730 mm (107.5 in)
- Length: 4,575–4,590 mm (180.1–180.7 in)
- Width: 1,800–1,816 mm (70.9–71.5 in)
- Height: 1,410–1,425 mm (55.5–56.1 in)
- Kerb weight: 1,558–1,741 kg (3,435–3,838 lb)

Chronology
- Successor: Lexus RC (for IS F)

=== 2005–2008 ===
The second-generation of the IS was introduced at the Geneva Motor Show in March 2005 as a pre-production model, with the production version debuting at the 2005 New York International Auto Show that April. Sales of the sedan began worldwide in September and October 2005 as a 2006 model, with the Toyota Altezza name discontinued due to the introduction of the Lexus marque in Japan, and the slow-selling SportCross station wagon version discontinued from the lineup altogether.

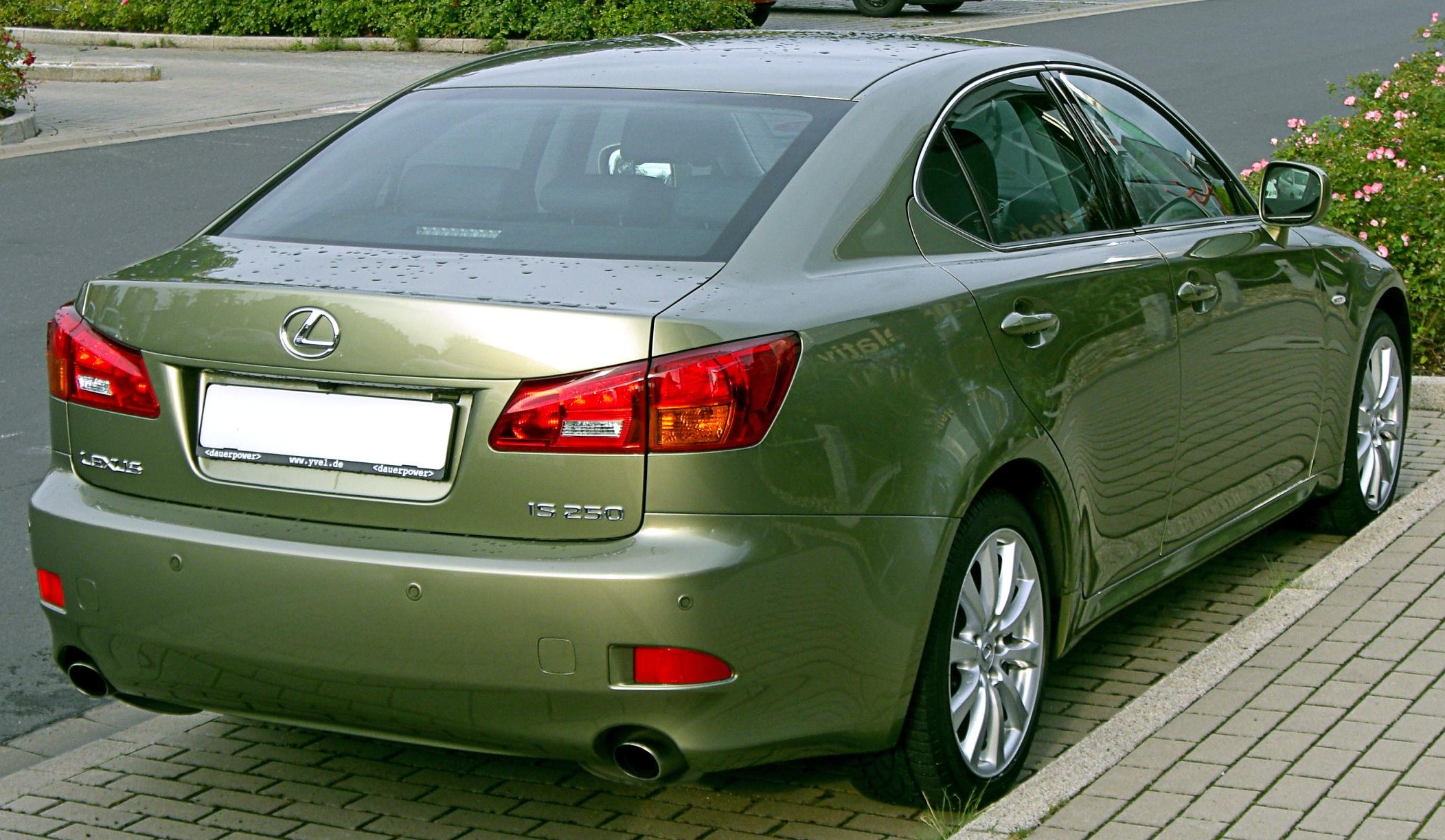
Pre-facelift Lexus IS 250 (GSE20, Europe)

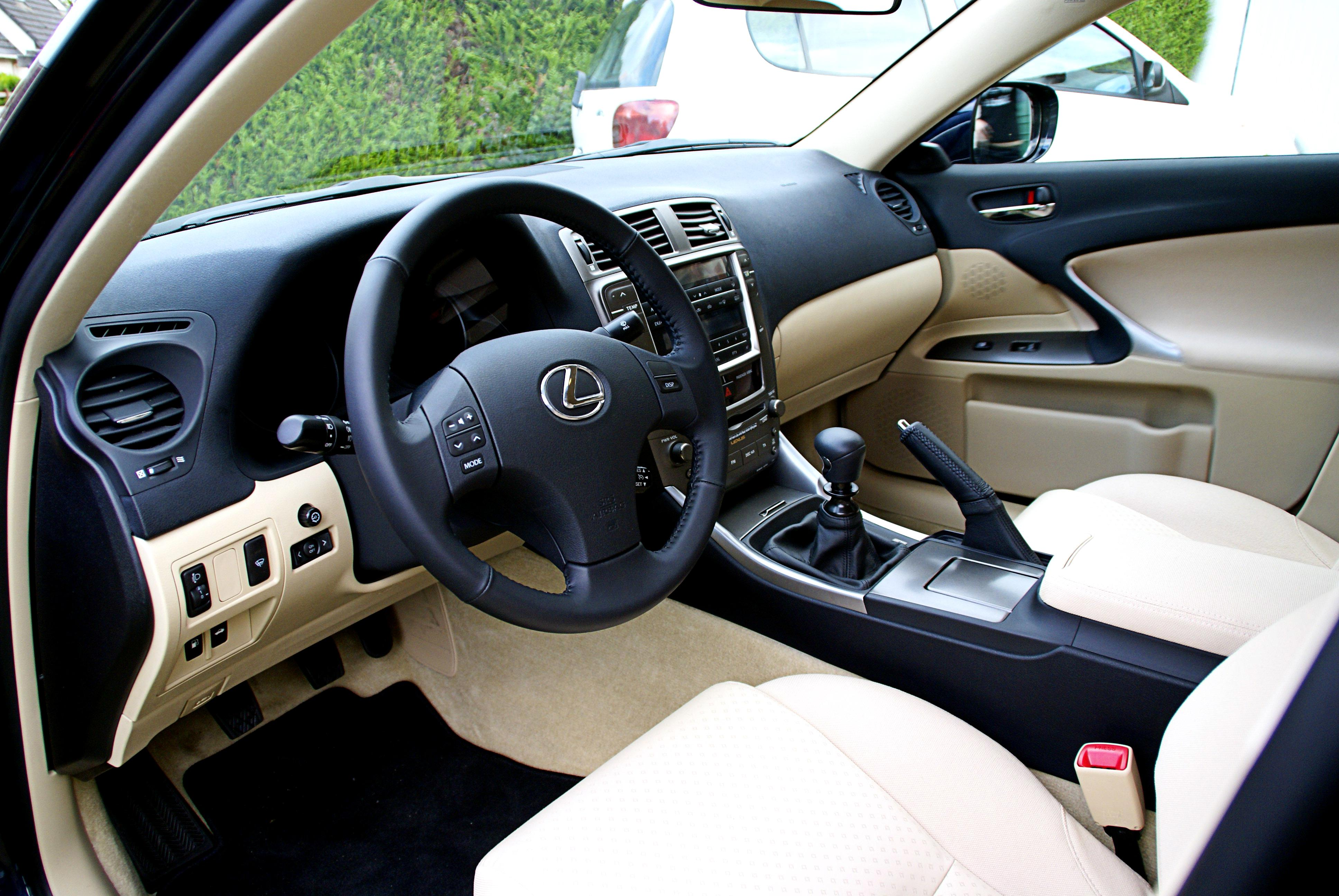
Interior

The second-generation IS marked the next introduction of Lexus' L-finesse design philosophy on a production vehicle, following the premiere of the 2006 GS executive sedan. The sedan's exterior design featured sleeker, coupé-like contours, a fastback profile, and a repeated arrowhead motif in the front fascia and side windows. The IS sedan has a drag coefficient of Cd=0.28.

Production of the sedan commenced in September 2005 at the Miyata plant in Miyawaka, Fukuoka, supplemented in October 2005 with the Tahara plant at Tahara, Aichi. Production of the IS F started in December 2007 at Tahara. The facility at Miyata began manufacture of the IS C in April 2009.

In North America, IS models sold at launch included the IS 250 and IS 350 sedans; in parts of Europe, the IS models sold by Lexus included the IS 250 and IS 220d sedans. The IS 250 was also available in Australia, New Zealand, Thailand, Singapore, Hong Kong, Taiwan, Chile (automatic only), South Africa and South Korea.

All second-generation IS models offered a more typical Lexus interior compared to the previous generation with a focus on luxurious amenities. The interior is equipped memory leather seats, lightsaber-like electroluminescent instrument display lighting and LED interior lighting accents, the choice of faux-metallic or optional Bird's Eye Maple wood trim (aluminium composite on the IS F), and SmartAccess keyless entry with push-button start. Options ranged from touchscreen navigation with backup camera to a Mark Levinson premium sound system and Dynamic Radar Cruise Control.

The introduction of the second-generation IS model marked a resurgence in sales for the IS line, with a 332% increase overall in 2006 compared to the previous year. In its first year of sales, the IS sold over 49,000 units, making it one of the ten best-selling luxury cars in the US. The IS line later took a median position in the entry-luxury market; in 2008 it sold behind the variants of the BMW 3 Series, Mercedes-Benz C-Class, and Cadillac CTS, and ahead of the Acura TL, Audi A4, and Infiniti G sedan. Outside the US, the Lexus IS spearheaded Lexus' growing sales efforts in Europe, Australia, and South Africa, becoming the best-selling model in Lexus' lineup in many of the aforementioned markets. In the US, as of 2011, the Lexus IS was the third place best-selling vehicle from the marque after the Lexus RX and Lexus ES.

=== IS F ===
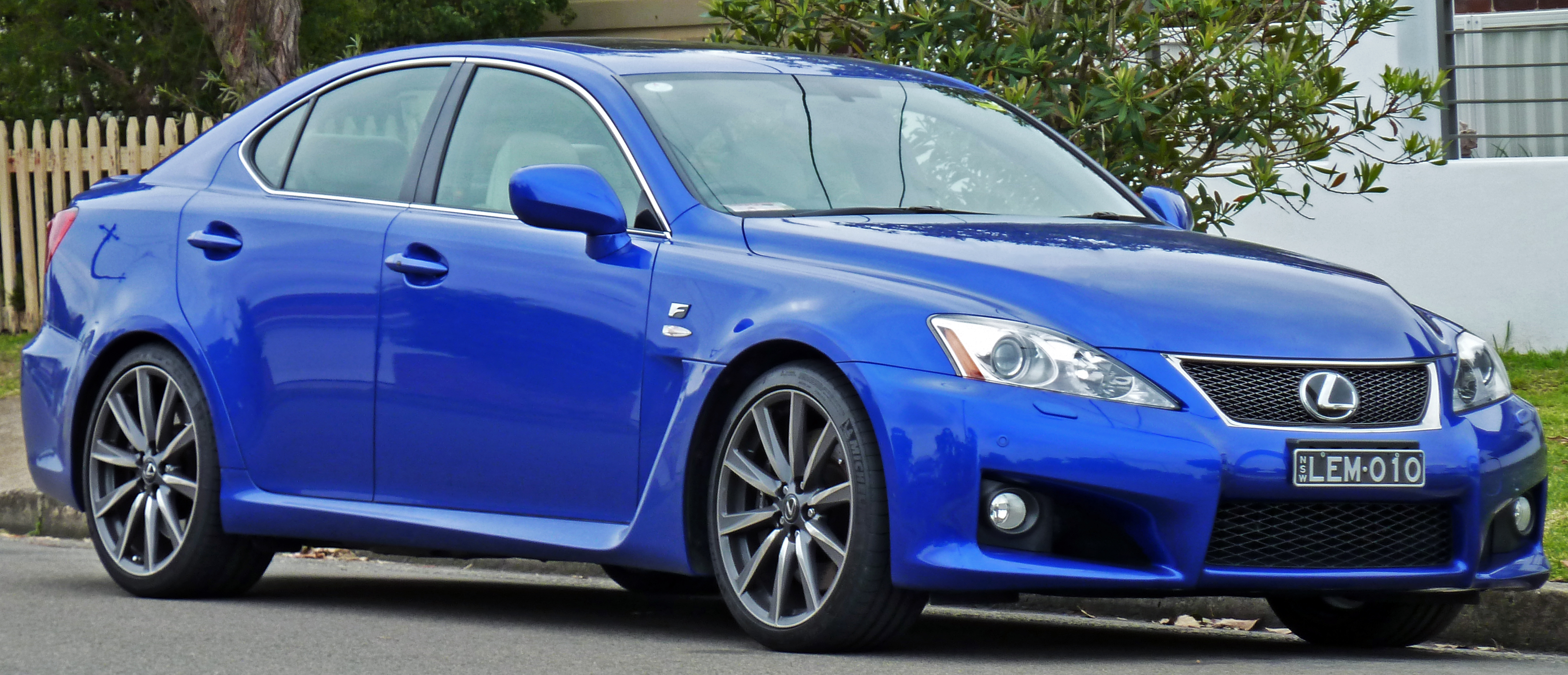
Lexus IS F (USE20R)

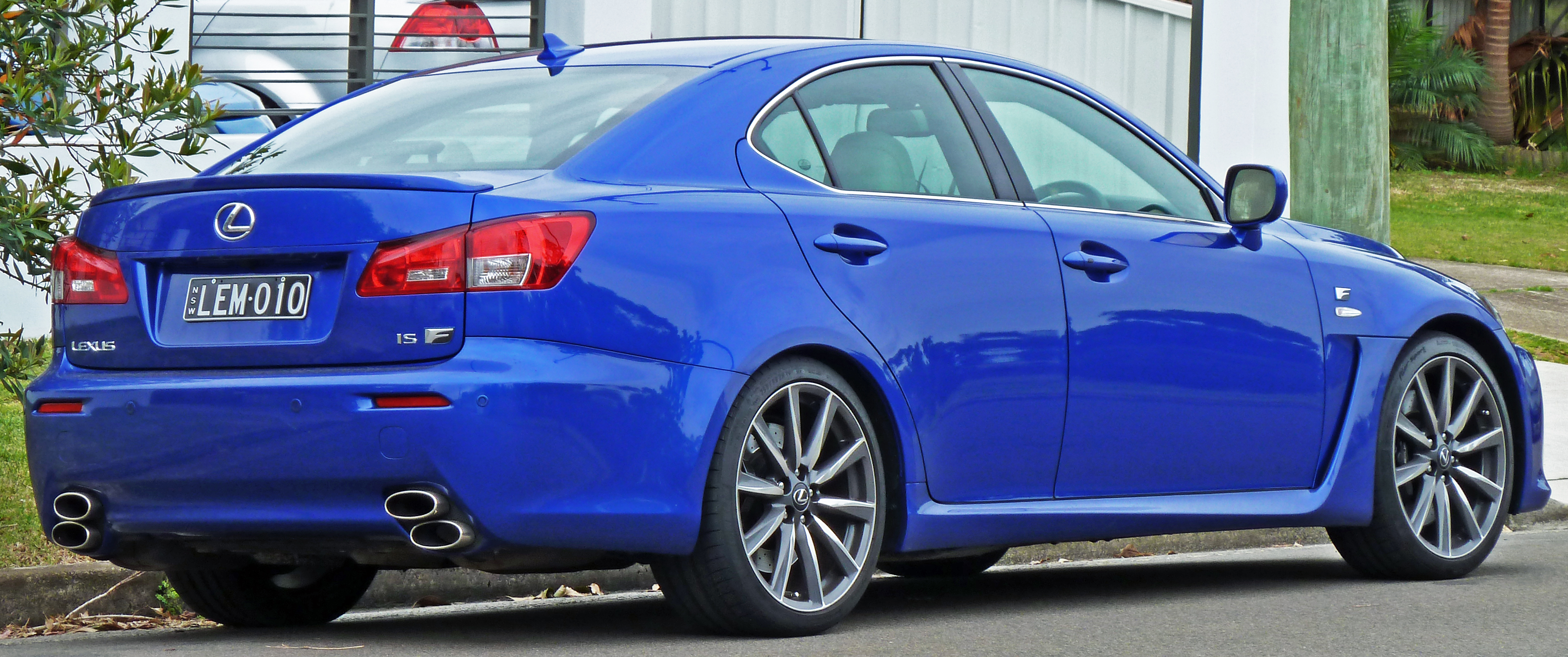
Lexus IS F (USE20R)

On 6 December 2006, Lexus officially confirmed the existence of a high-performance variant of the second-generation IS called the IS F. The Lexus IS F sedan (USE20) premiered at the 2007 North American International Auto Show on 8 January 2007 as the launch product of Lexus' F marque lineup of performance-focused vehicles. The IS F went on sale several months later in North America and Europe. The IS F was capable of accelerating from 0–97 km/h (0–60 mph) in 4.2 seconds, and had an electronically limited top speed of 274 km/h (170 mph).

=== 2008–2010 ===
In 2008, the IS line received a facelift, and the suspension and steering were retuned for improved stability and control. After three years with only one body style, the IS returned with a second body style, this time as a coupé convertible, on 2 October 2008 when the IS 250 C debuted at the Paris Motor Show. A more powerful IS 350 C also became available, with engine specifications analogous to those on the sedan models. The IS convertible went on sale in Europe in 2009, in North America in May 2009, and an IS 300 C was also produced for certain regions. The mid-cycle refresh in 2008 saw slight styling revisions to the interior.

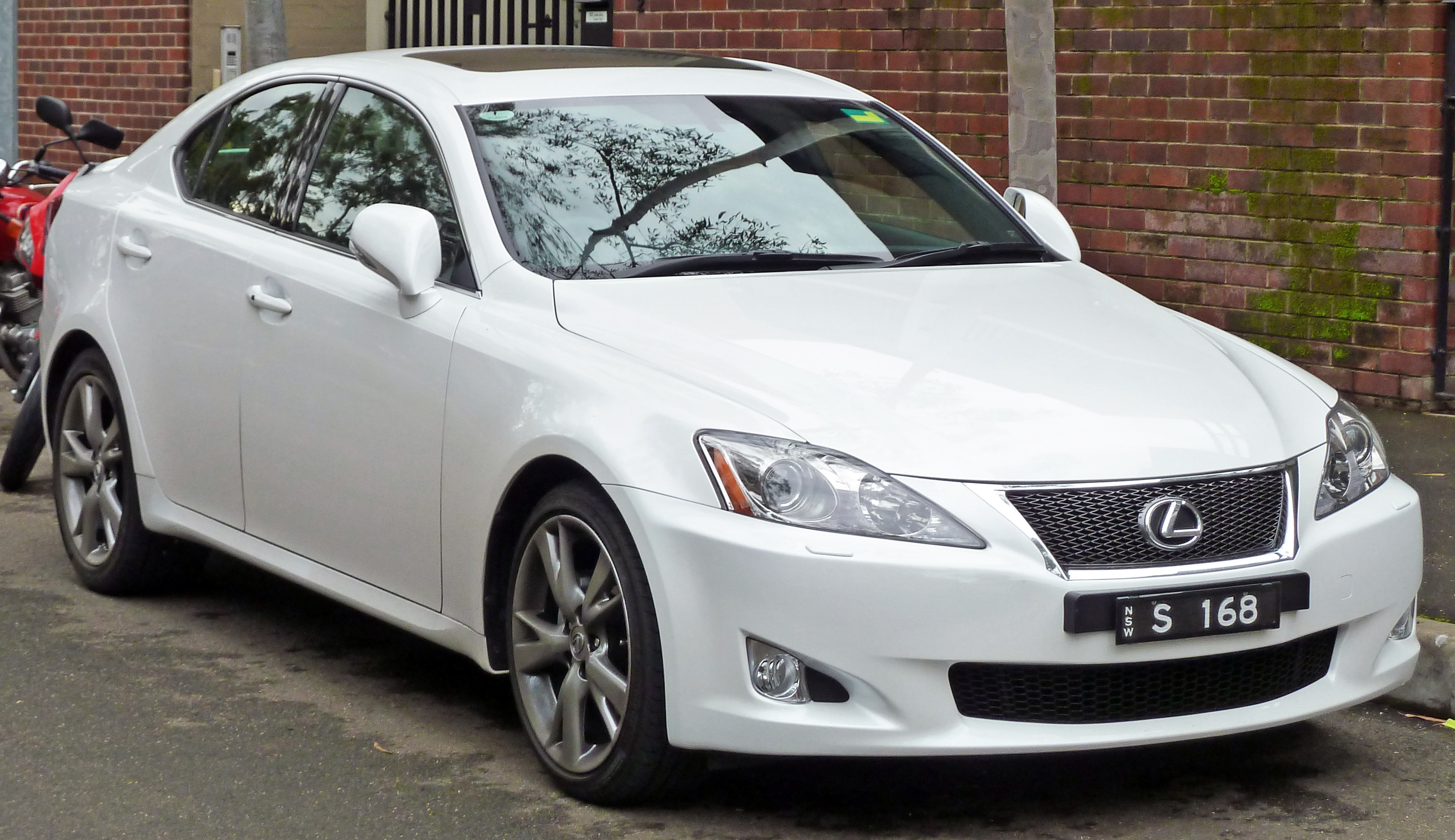
First facelift Lexus IS 250 Prestige (GSE20R, Australia)

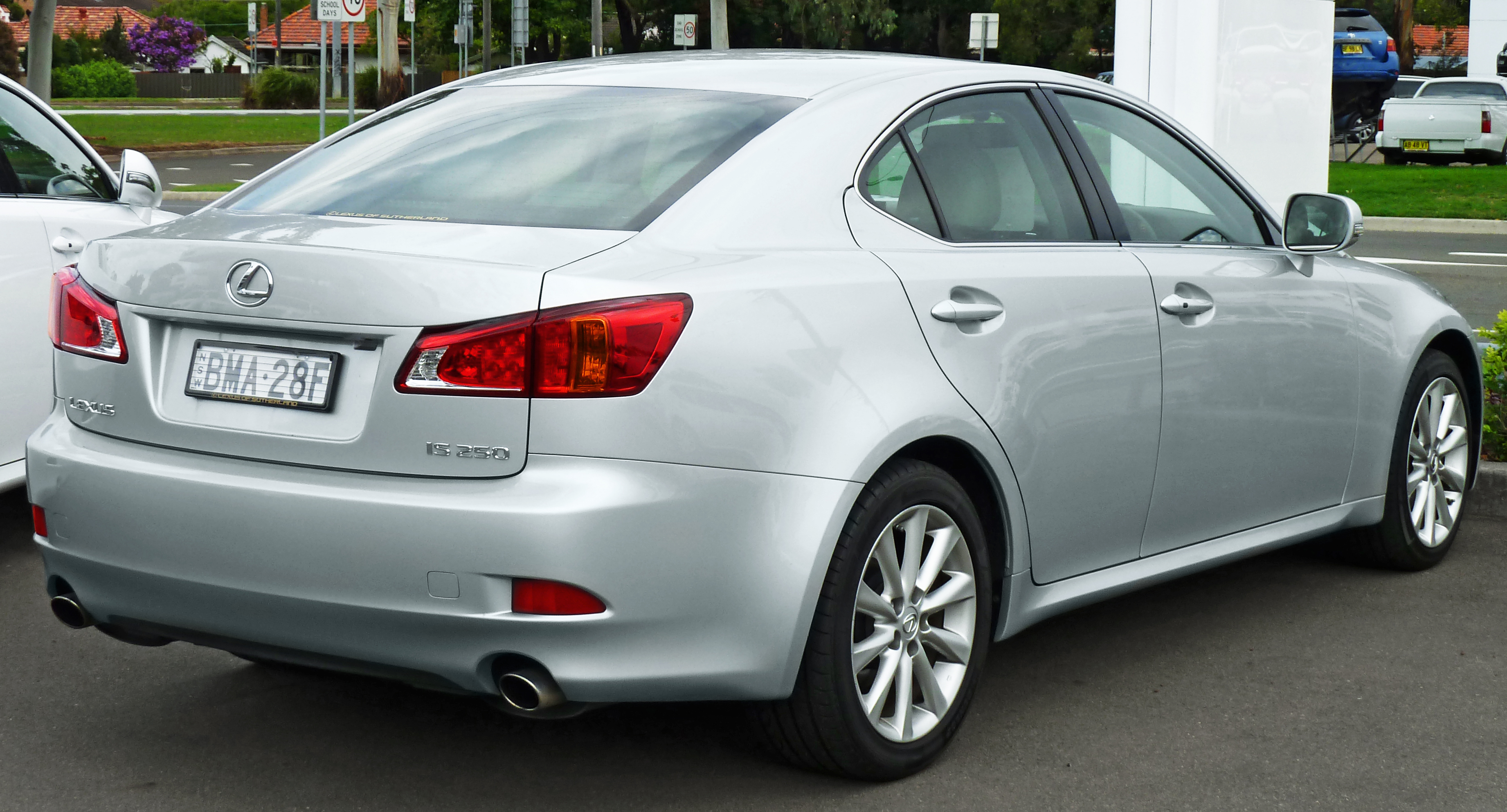
First facelift Lexus IS 250 Prestige (GSE20R, Australia)

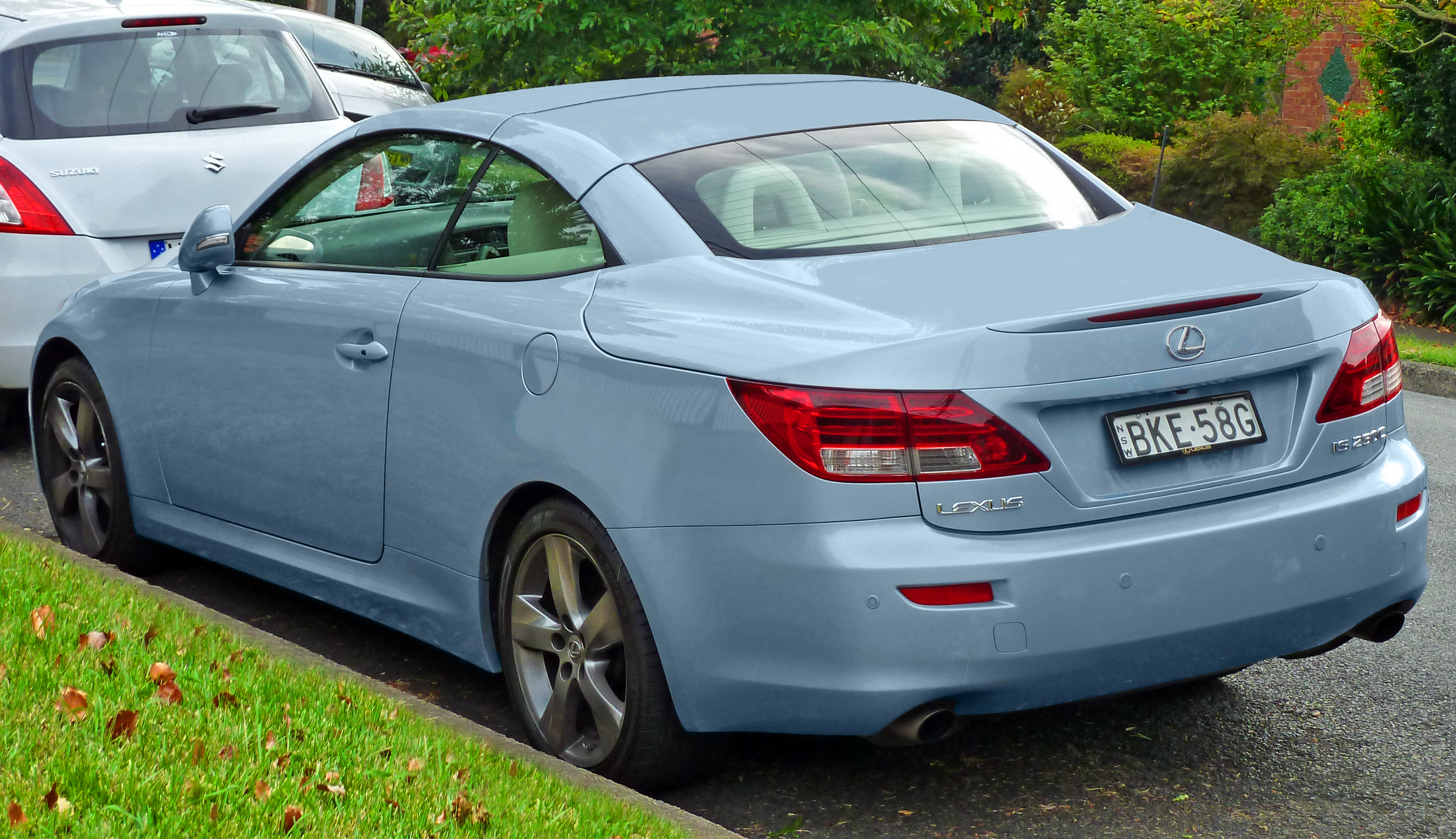
First facelift Lexus IS 250 C (GSE20R, Australia)

=== 2010–2013 ===
In 2010, coinciding with the second IS line refresh, the revised diesel IS 220d was detuned for improved fuel consumption figures but lowered power output by 27 hp (20 kW; 27 PS). Building on its "F Sport" line of parts and accessories for the IS 250/350, Lexus added factory-produced F Sport IS models in 2010. This facelift also includes further interior updates for the IS line.

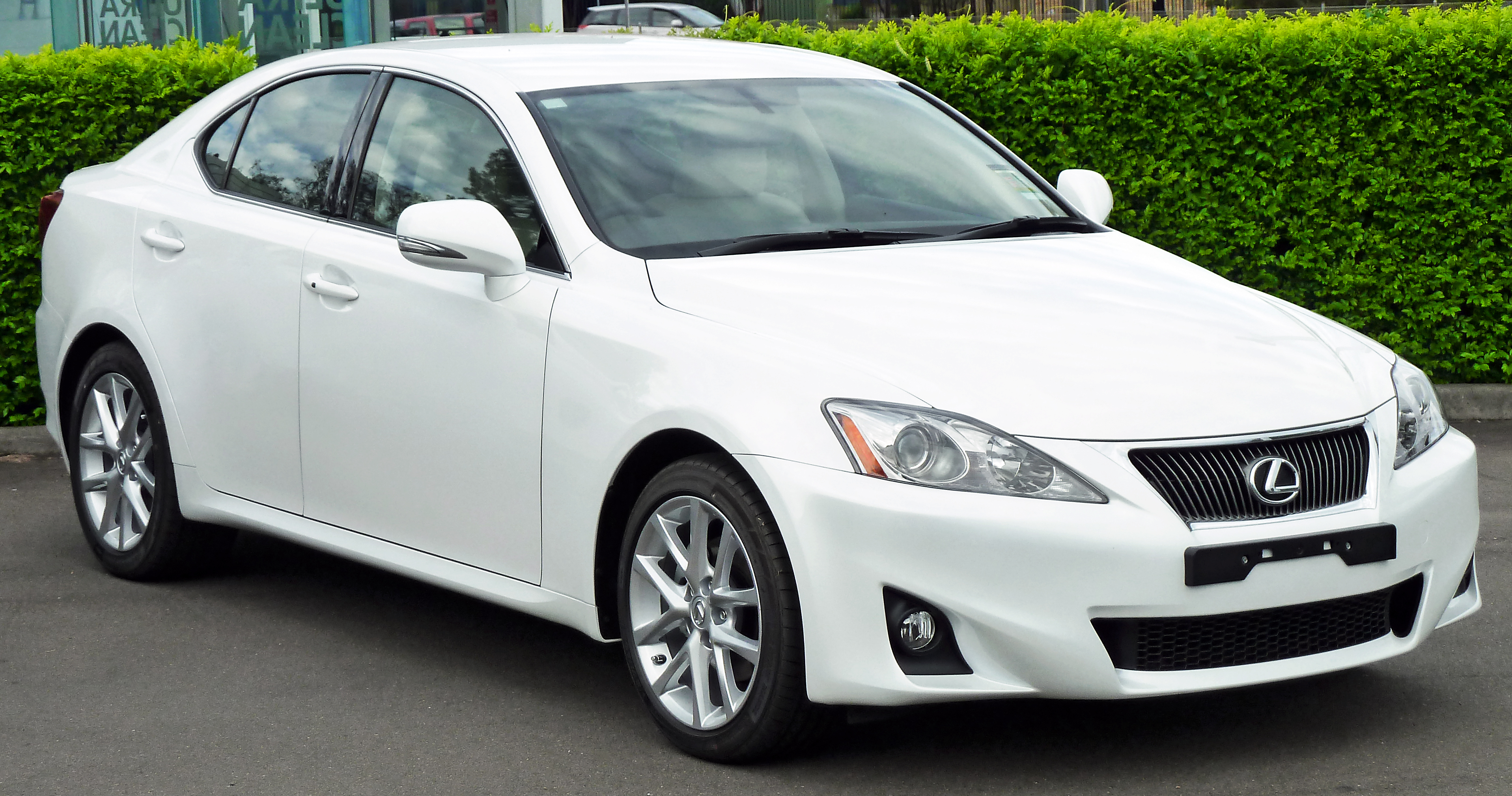
Second facelift Lexus IS 250 Prestige (GSE20R, Australia)

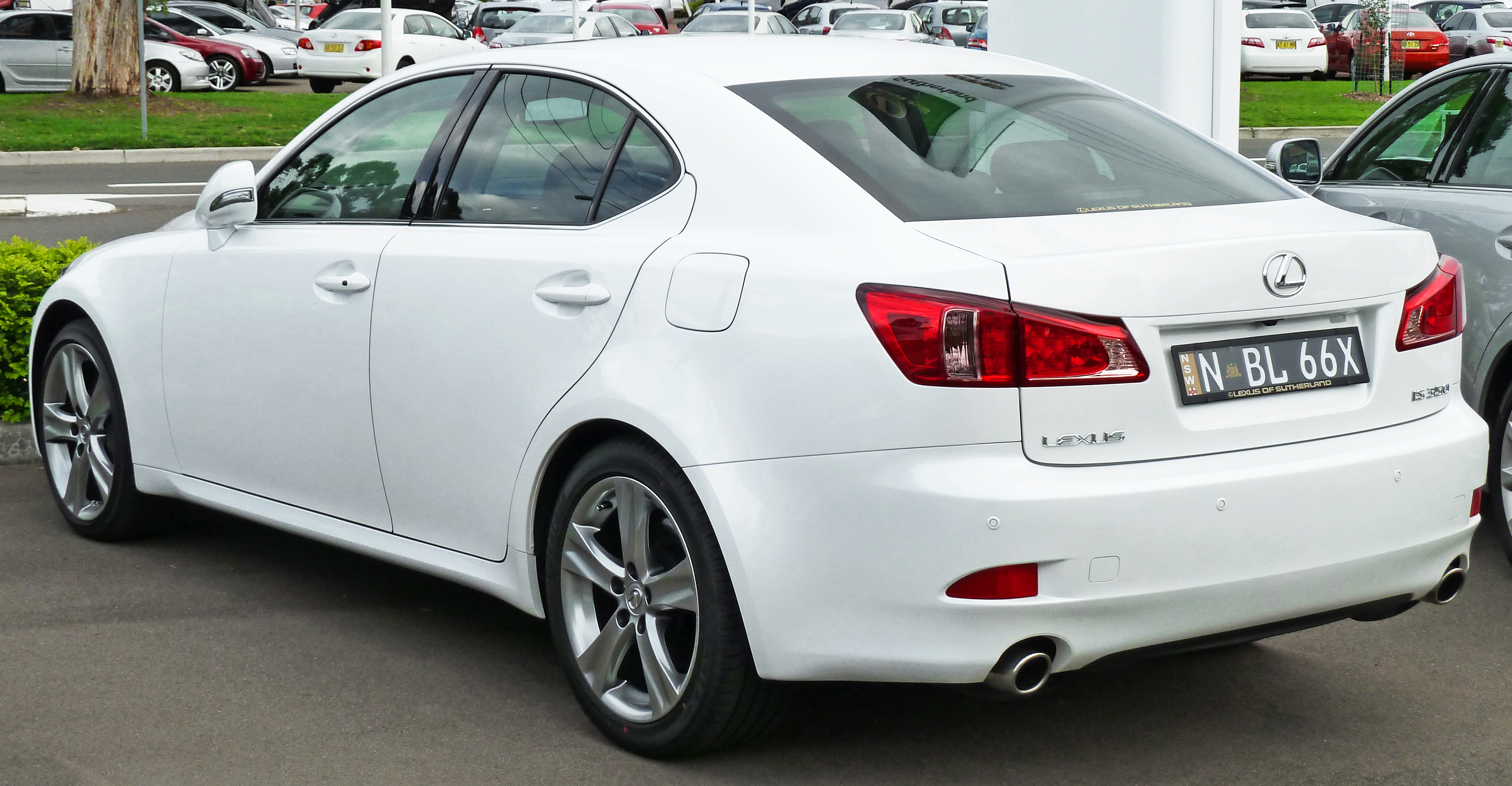
Second facelift Lexus IS 350 (GSE21R, Australia)

=== 2013–2015 ===
Changes to the IS C include Intelligent Transport Systems and Dedicated Short Range Communication units become standard equipment. Change to US model of F SPORT Package includes revised silver metallic interior trim. Change to Japan F SPORT Package includes dark rose interior colour, medium silver ornament panel. F SPORT performance accessories include 19-inch forged wheels (set of four), with hardware; brake upgrades, front axle set, rear axle set, carbon fibre engine cover, carbon fibre leather shift knob, floor mats (four-piece set), lowering spring set, performance air intake, performance dual exhaust, shock set (set of four), sway bar set Japan models went on sale on 22 August 2013. Early models include IS 250C, IS 350C. US models went on sale as 2014 model year vehicle. Early models include IS 250C, IS 350C.

Changes to IS F include a carbon fibre rear spoiler, front LED fog lamp, all sports seats include embossed 'F' logo at head rests, Alcantara upholstery door trim and center console, standard Intelligent Transport Systems, and Dedicated Short Range Communication unit. IS F Dynamic Sport Tuning model (available in Japan) includes 7 PS (5.1 kW; 6.9 hp) engine power increase via low-friction piston and pump, strengthened body contact, carbon fibre front spoiler/rear diffuser, 7 kg (15 lb) lower body weight via titanium muffler, orange colour brake caliper with LEXUS logo, orange accent engine headcover, carbon interior panel on the centre console and door switch base with nameplate, choice of 7 body colours including starlight black glass flake. Japan models went on sale on 5 September 2013. US models went on sale as 2014 model year vehicle.

=== Safety ===
ANCAP test results Lexus IS variant(s) as tested (2005)
Test	Score
Overall	5 /5 stars
Frontal offset	13.40/16
Side impact	16/16
Pole	2/2
Seat belt reminders	2/3
Whiplash protection	Not Assessed
Pedestrian protection	Marginal
Electronic stability control	Standard

Safety equipment on the IS models ranged from multiple airbags to stability control systems. A Pre-Collision System (PCS) was the first offered in the entry-luxury performance sedan market segment. NHTSA crash test results rated the second-generation IS the maximum five stars in the Side Driver and Rollover categories, and four stars in the Frontal Driver, Frontal Passenger, and Side Rear Passenger categories; Insurance Institute for Highway Safety scores were "Good" overall score for all fourteen measured categories in the front and side impact crash tests.

=== Powertrains ===
Petrol and diesel engines
Calendar year(s)	Model no(s).	Chassis code(s)	Engine type	Engine code	Transmission(s)	Power	Torque
2005–2012	IS 220d	ALE20	2.2 L L4	2AD-FHV	6-speed MT (RA63)	130 kW (174 hp)	400 N⋅m (295 lbf⋅ft) at 2,600 rpm
2005–2012	IS 250	GSE20	2.5 L V6	4GR-FSE	6-speed MT (RA62)	153 kW (205 hp)	252 N⋅m (186 lbf⋅ft) at 4,800 rpm
2005–2013	IS 250	GSE20	2.5 L V6	4GR-FSE	6-speed AT (A960E)	153 kW (205 hp)	252 N⋅m (186 lbf⋅ft) at 4,800 rpm
2005–2013	IS 250 AWD	GSE25	2.5 L V6	4GR-FSE	6-speed AT (A760F)	153 kW (205 hp)	252 N⋅m (186 lbf⋅ft) at 4,800 rpm
2005–2013	IS 350	GSE21	3.5 L V6	2GR-FSE	6-speed AT (A760E)	228 kW (306 hp)	375 N⋅m (277 lbf⋅ft) at 4,800 rpm
2006–2013	IS 300	GSE22	3.0 L V6	3GR-FE	6-speed AT (A760E)	170 kW (228 hp)	300 N⋅m (221 lbf⋅ft) at 4,400 rpm
2007–2014	IS F	USE20	5.0 L V8	2UR-GSE	8-speed AT (AA80E)	310 kW (416 hp)	503 N⋅m (371 lbf⋅ft) at 5,200 rpm
2009–2012	IS 250 C	GSE20	2.5 L V6	4GR-FSE	6-speed MT (RA62)	153 kW (205 hp)	252 N⋅m (186 lbf⋅ft) at 4,800 rpm
2009–2013	IS 250 C	GSE20	2.5 L V6	4GR-FSE	6-speed AT (A960E)	153 kW (205 hp)	252 N⋅m (186 lbf⋅ft) at 4,800 rpm
2009–2015	IS 350 C	GSE21	3.5 L V6	2GR-FSE	6-speed AT (A760E)	228 kW (306 hp)	375 N⋅m (277 lbf⋅ft) at 4,800 rpm
2009–2015	IS 300 C	GSE22	3.0 L V6	3GR-FE	6-speed AT (A760E)	170 kW (228 hp)	300 N⋅m (221 lbf⋅ft) at 4,400 rpm
2010–2012	IS 200d	ALE20	2.2 L L4	2AD-FTV	6-speed MT (RA63)	110 kW (148 hp)	360 N⋅m (266 lbf⋅ft) at 2,600 rpm
2010–2013	IS 350 AWD	GSE26	3.5 L V6	2GR-FSE	6-speed AT (A760F)	228 kW (306 hp)	375 N⋅m (277 lbf⋅ft) at 4,800 rpm

The IS 250, IS 350 and IS F are equipped with a D-4 (IS250) or D-4S (IS350 and IS F) direct injection system with direct fuel injectors (D-4 and D-4S) and port fuel injectors (D-4S only). Certain Asian markets have the IS 300 (GSE22) model without direct injection.

== Third generation (XE30; 2013) ==
Third generation
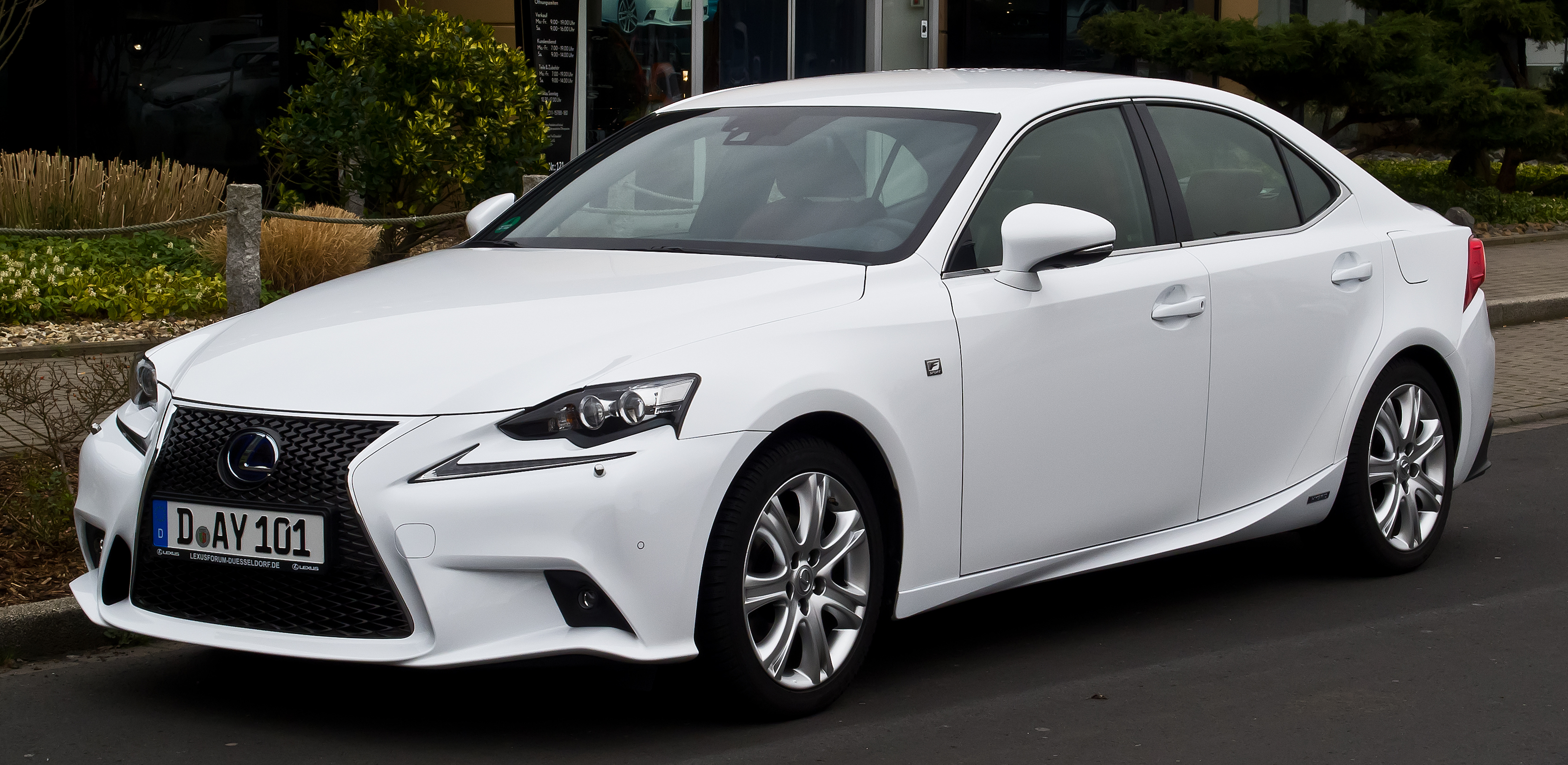
- Pre-facelift Lexus IS 300h F Sport (AVE30, Germany)

Overview
- Model code: XE30
- Production: April 2013 –present
- Model years: 2014–present
- Assembly: Japan: Tahara, Aichi (Tahara plant)
- Designer: Masanari Sakae (2010); Yuki Isogai (2011); 2021 facelift: Kenichi Hirai

Body and chassis
- Body style: 4-door sedan
- Platform: Toyota New N platform
- Related: Lexus RC

Powertrain
- Engine: Petrol: 2.0 L 8AR-FTS I4-T (ASE30; IS 200t/300); 2.5 L 4GR-FSE V6 (GSE30/35; IS 250); 3.5 L 2GR-FSE V6 (GSE31/36/37; IS 300 AWD/350); 3.5 L 2GR-FKS V6 (GSE31/36/37; IS 300 AWD/350); 5.0 L 2UR-GSE V8 (USE30; IS 500); Petrol hybrid: 2.5 L 2AR-FSE I4 (AVE30/35; IS 300h)
- Electric motor: 1KM permanent magnet synchronous (IS 300h)
- Transmission: 6-speed A960E automatic (GSE30; IS 250); 6-speed A760H automatic (GSE35/36/37; IS 250 AWD/300 AWD/350 AWD); 8-speed AA81E "Direct Shift" automatic (ASE30/GSE31; IS 200t/300/350); 8-speed AA80E "Direct Shift" automatic (USE30; IS 500); eCVT L210/L210F with sequential shift mode (AVE30/35; IS 300h)
- Battery: 230.4 – 650 V nickel metal hydride 192 cells

Dimensions
- Wheelbase: 2,800 mm (110.2 in)
- Length: 4,665 mm (183.7 in) (2013–2020); 4,710 mm (185.4 in) (2020–2025); 4,720 mm (185.8 in) (2025–present)
- Width: 1,810 mm (71.3 in) (2013–2020); 1,840 mm (72.4 in) (2020–present)
- Height: 1,430 mm (56.3 in) (2013–2020); 1,435–1,440 mm (56.5–56.7 in) (2020–present)
- Kerb weight: 1,590–1,720 kg (3,505–3,792 lb); 1,620–1,780 kg (3,571–3,924 lb) (hybrid)

=== Concept model ===
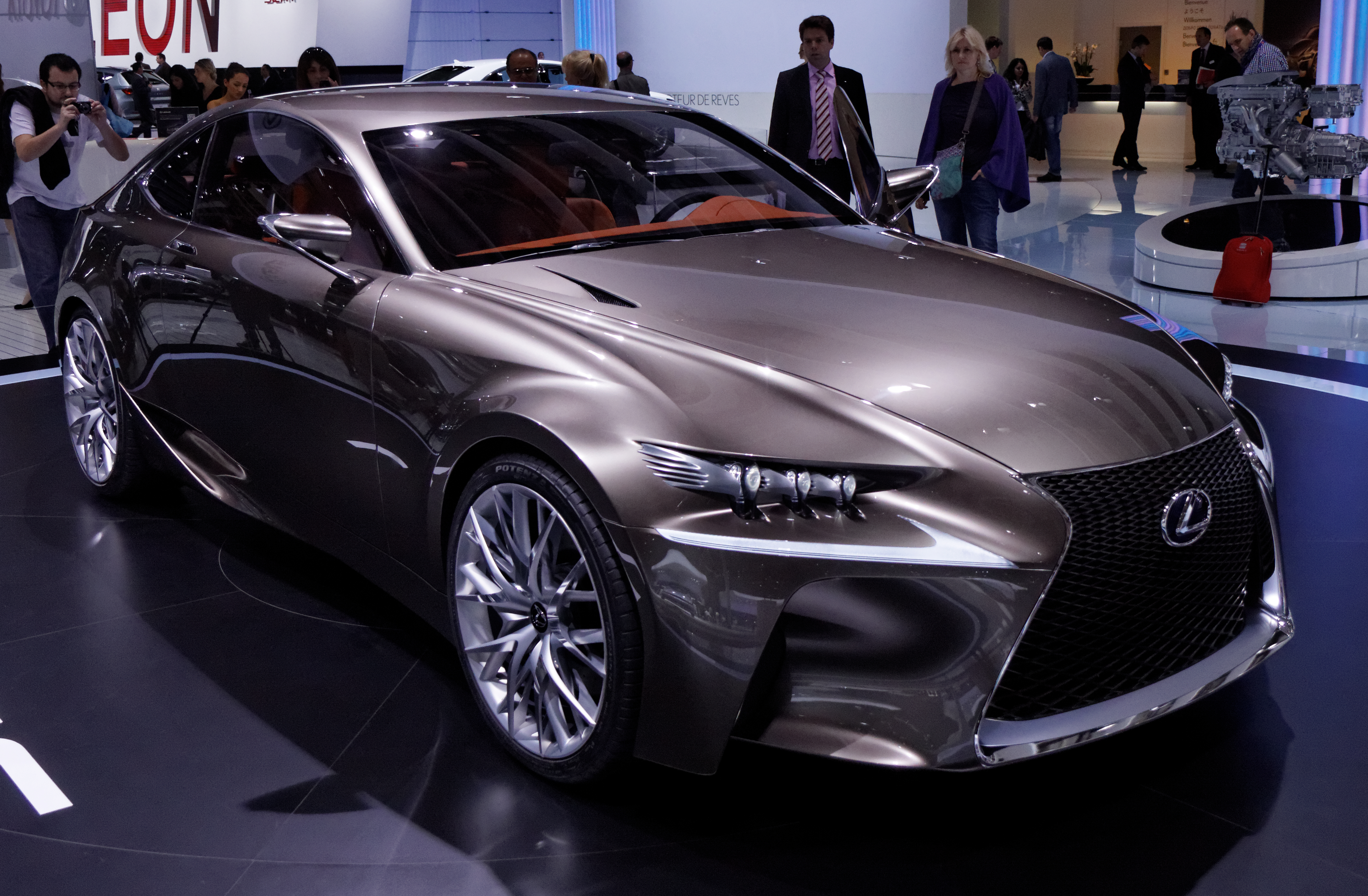
Lexus LF-CC concept

The LF-CC concept unveiled at the 2012 Paris Motor Show and later Auto Shanghai 2013 is a rear-wheel drive coupé incorporating designs from LF-LC concept and Lexus LFA. Main features include a 2.5-litre four-cylinder Atkinson cycle petrol engine with D-4S direct injection technology, water-cooled permanent magnet electric motor, 3 LED-projector headlamp design, Daytime Running Lights (DRLs) integrated into the upper bumper surface, rear spoiler integrated within the boot lid, L-shaped combination lamps with three-dimensional design, Fluid Titanium body colour, 2-zone dashboard, seats, door panels and instrument binnacle bonnet upholstered in amber leather.

=== 2013–2016 ===
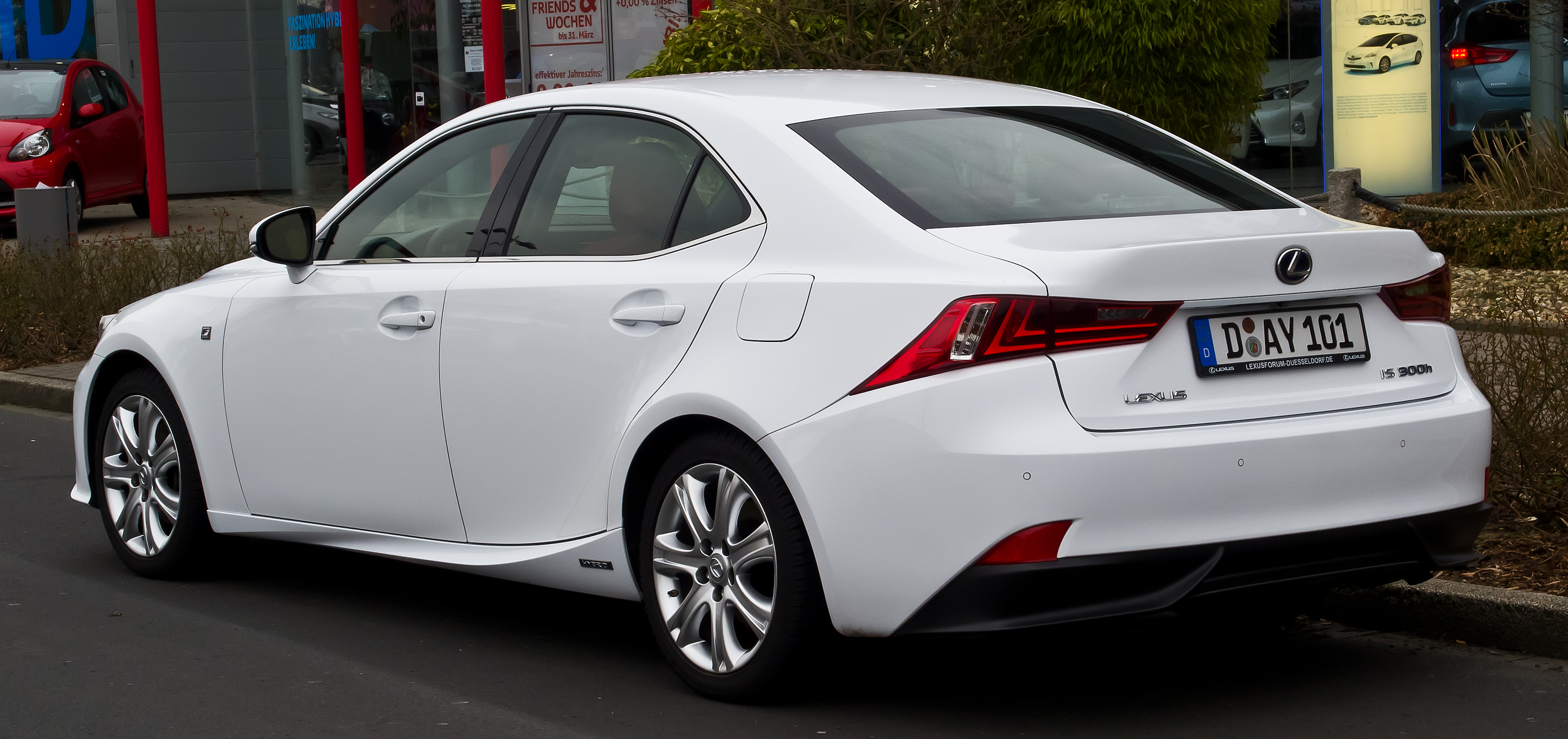
2014 Lexus IS 300h F Sport (AVE30)

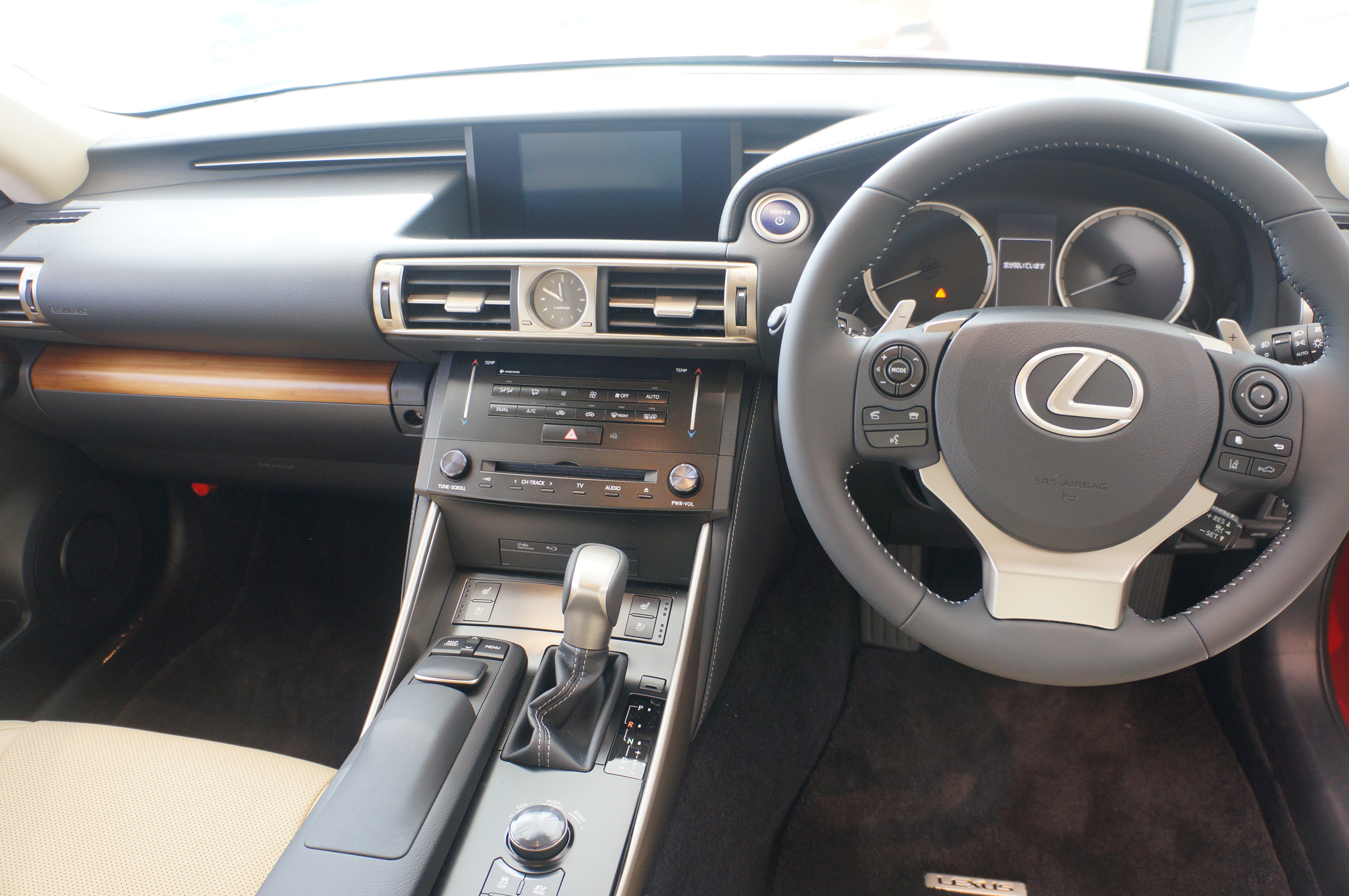
Interior

The production version of the IS was introduced at the North American International Auto Show in January 2013, followed by the 2013 Auto Shanghai. Exterior design work was done by Masanari Sakae during 2010–2011 and the F Sport models were styled by Yuki Isogai in 2011. For the car's third generation, Lexus also hinted at a revival for the IS SportCross station wagon, but that didn't end up happening.

The IS F Sport models include enhanced handling and performance, Adaptive Variable Suspension and Variable Gear Ratio Steering (IS 350). Not only do the F Sport models handle differently, but they are more aggressively styled to set them apart from the base production models. F-Sport styling includes an edition specific F-Sport pattern front grille, F-Sport logo badges, and five spoke split graphite wheels; the cabin includes carbon fibre-like trim, extra bolstered performance seats, an all-black headliner, and a moving vessel gauge cluster (inspired by the Lexus LFA) that displays navigation and audio information. The F-Sport models have an edition specific Ultra White exterior and Rioja Red interior. The 2014 model year also served as the first year to offer all-wheel drive in the IS F Sport line up.

International models went on sale in mid-2013. Early models included the IS 250 RWD, IS 250 AWD, IS 300h and IS 350 RWD. The hybrid IS 300h model is sold in Europe, Japan, and select international markets.

US models went on sale as 2014 model year vehicles on 28 June 2013. Early models include IS 250 RWD, IS 250 AWD, IS 350 RWD, IS 350 AWD. In 2015, for the 2016 model year, the IS 250 was discontinued and replaced by the rear wheel drive only IS 200t. The IS 300 is only offered with all-wheel drive, while the top-of-the-line IS 350 can be ordered with either drivetrain. The IS AWD versions use a full-time all-wheel drive system that utilizes a planetary gearset center differential coupled with a multi-disc clutch to act as the slip limiting device. The planetary gearset provides a 30:70 front-to-rear torque split under normal conditions for handling agility, however the system can allow for a torque split of up to 50:50 to control wheel slip. In August 2017, for the 2018 model year, the IS 300 RWD changed to using the 2.0-litre four-cylinder engine from the previous IS 200t while the IS 300 AWD retained the same 3.5-litre V6 engine.

Chinese models went on sale in 2013. Early models include the IS 250 and the IS 250 F Sport.

Japanese models went on sale on 16 May 2013. Early models include the IS 250, IS 250 AWD, IS 350 and the IS 300h.

European models arrived at dealerships in 2013 June/July. Early models include the IS 250 and the IS 300h. For the UK market, the IS 200t was offered in SE, Sport, F Sport and Premier model grades. The IS 300h was also available in those grades plus additional Executive, Luxury, and Advance grades. The base model SE came with 16-inch alloys wheels, the Executive, Luxury and Advance wear 17-inch, and the Sport and Premier are equipped with 5-spoke 18-inch. The 10-spoke 18-inch alloy wheels were exclusively for the F Sport which also features sport suspension with lateral damping system, an F Sport mesh grille, instrument meters inspired by the Lexus LFA, aluminium sports pedals and leather trim on the steering wheel and gear lever.

South Korean models went on sale on 27 June 2013. Early models include the IS 250 Supreme and the IS 250 Executive.

Australian models went on sale in July 2013. Only rear-wheel-drive versions were on offer, the models included the IS 250, IS 300h and the IS 350. The IS 250 was dropped from the line-up in September 2015 and was replaced with the IS 200t.

=== 2017 facelift ===
The revamped third generation model includes updated headlamps, taillamps, front fascia and bonnet. It debuted at the April 2016 Beijing Auto Show with interior technology improvements including 10.3 inch infotainment screen, updated steering wheel, and contrast stitching along the dash.

The Lexus IS receives subtle updates in 2017, for the 2018 model year. Most notably, its V-6 engines get a 5-hp power increase, and the rear-drive, inline-four-powered IS200t is now called the IS300. Joining the options list is adaptive front lighting, which turns the headlights with the steering wheel to improve visibility. The F Sport performance trim now includes a standard limited-slip rear differential, but only in the top-tier rear-drive IS350.

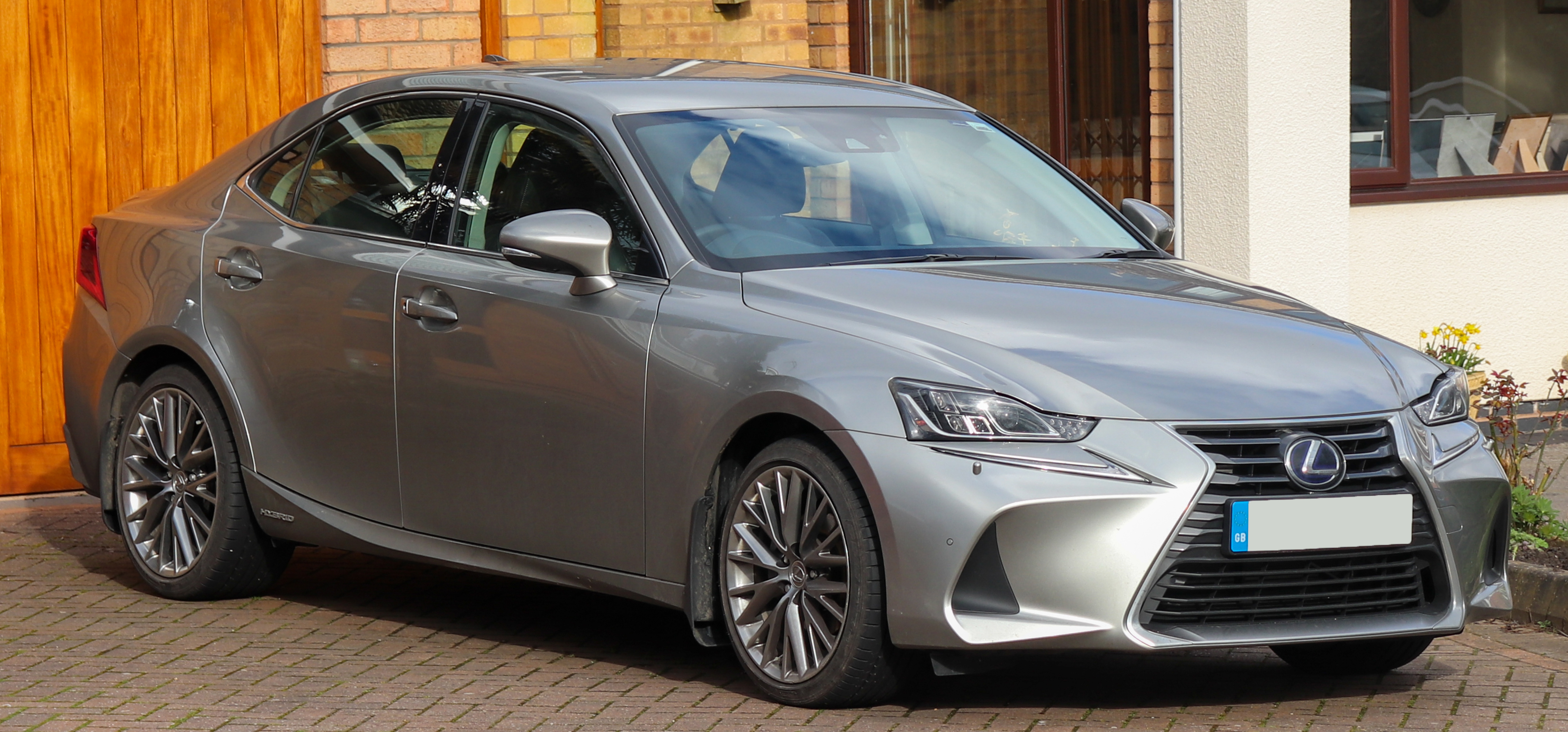
2019 Lexus IS 300h (AVE30, UK)

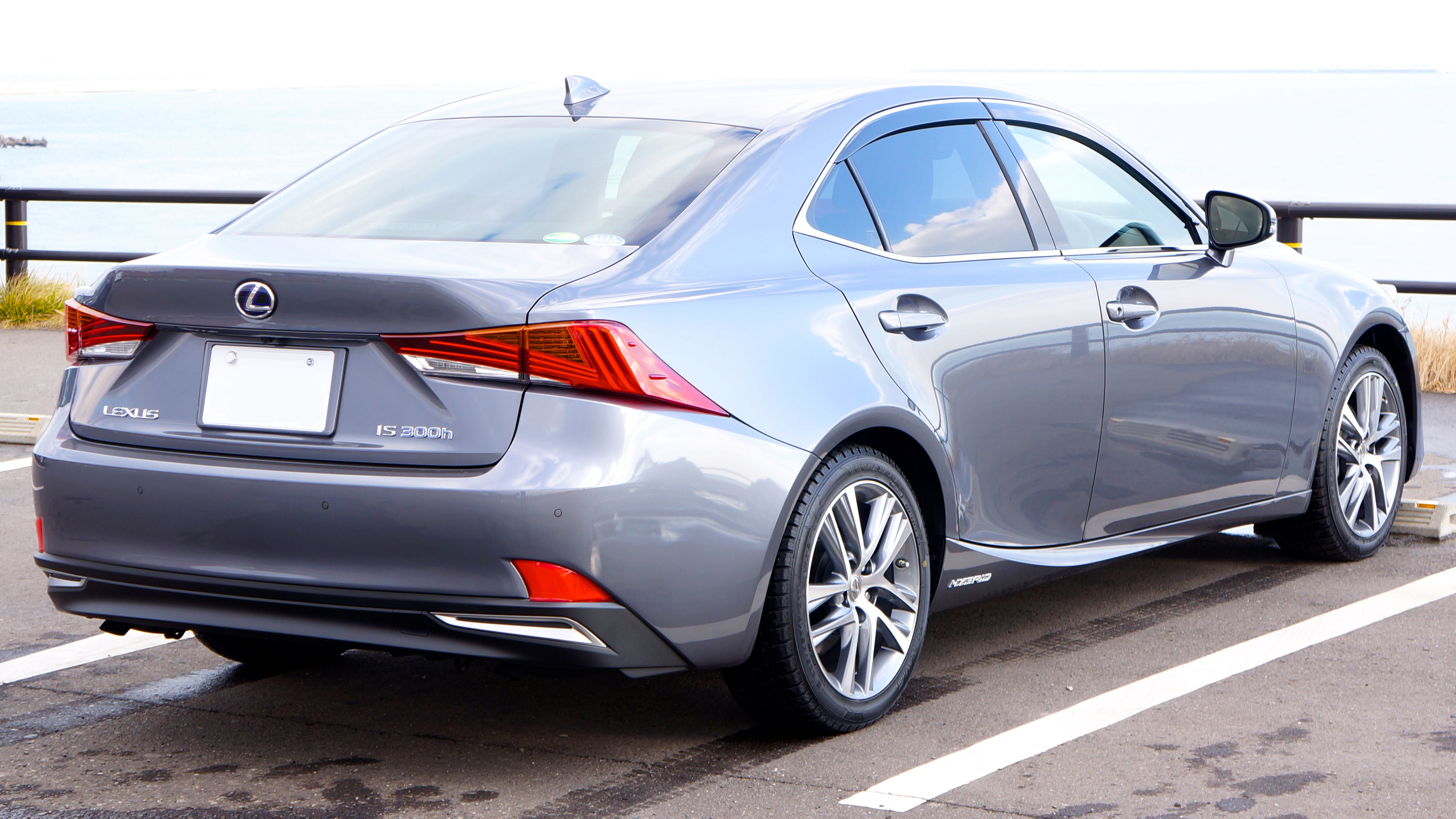
2017 Lexus IS 300h (AVE30, Japan)

=== 2020 facelift ===
The IS received a major facelift in 2020 for the 2021 model year.

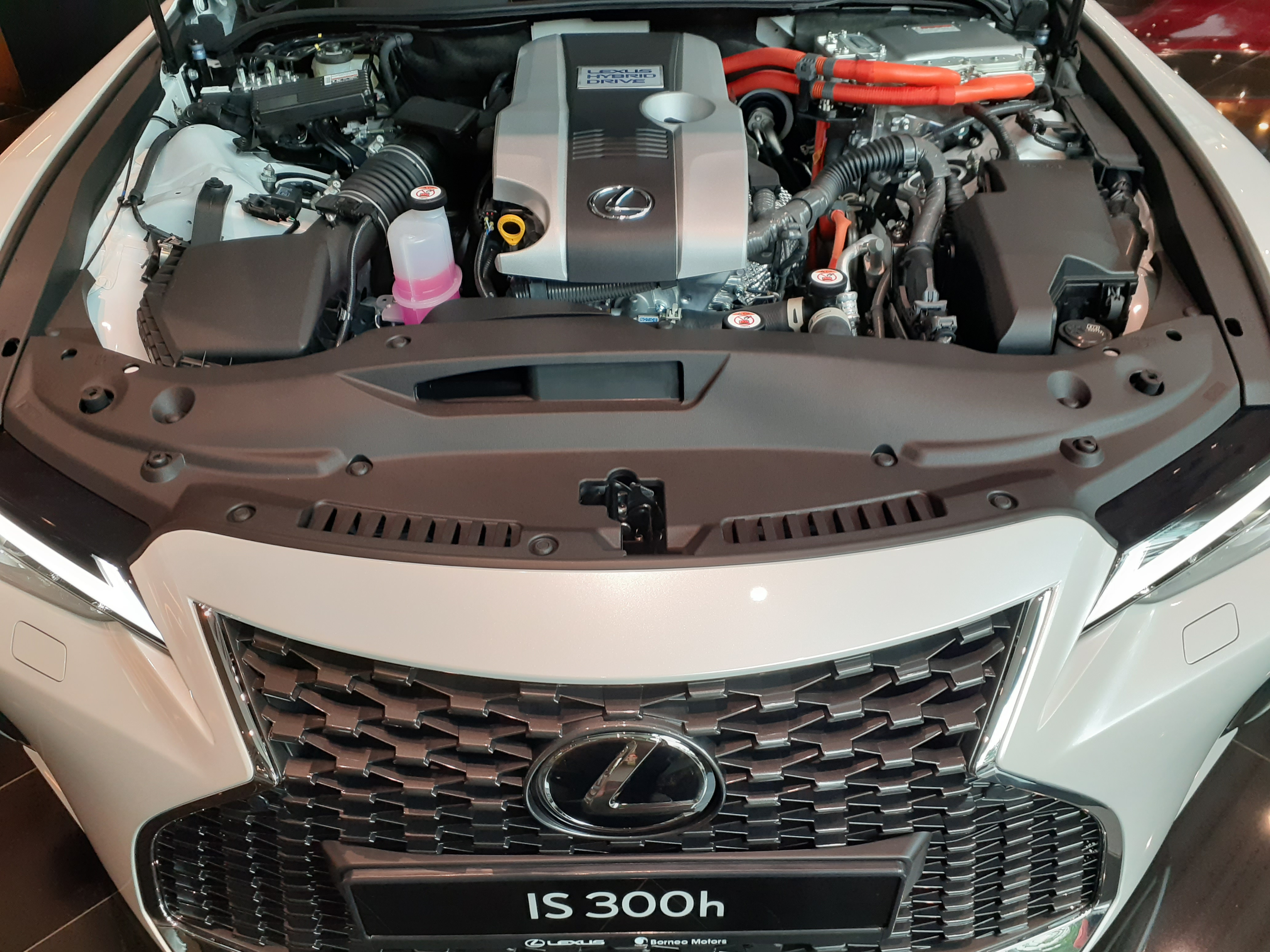
2AR-FSE engine in a Lexus IS 300h (AVE30)

The updated styling includes a larger bodywork, restyled headlamps and full-width taillamps, slightly updated dashboard, the center console/cupholders and trackpad and armrest from the Lexus RC and a larger spindle grille design. The parking brake pedal was replaced with an auto electric parking brake, and a new switch to control it. The black headliner in the F-Sport models has been changed to a sportier fabric (changed from the soft black headliner of older models). Brake hold feature has been added. An Active Sound Control has been added, which generates sound from behind the instrument panel (the F-Sport models still have the electronically controlled intake valve which can open up to let more real engine sound into the cabin just like the 2014 - 2020 models). The rear boot water channels have plastic guards to divert leaves and twigs away from the taillight panels. Android Auto and Apple CarPlay capabilities were made available, as well as upgraded driver-assistance systems (auto headlights have been upgraded to be simpler to activate and to ignore false positives) and standard blind-spot monitoring with a new adjustable distance function and 3 levels of brightness. The suspension has also been revised with a more rigid body, more rigid C pillars, extra welding on the radiator mount points and front side members, new swing-valve shock absorbers equipped with ultra low-velocity valves, aluminium wishbone front suspension. The transmission tune was also slightly updated, the IS350 (AWD tested, RWD not yet tested) will downshift to 2nd gear up to 90 kmh / 56 mph (up from 84 kmh / 52 mph from the previous 2014 - 2020 models). In the United States, the F Sport trim is only available on the top IS350 model with its 232 kW (311 hp) 3.5-litre V-6.

The Dynamic Handling Package (DHP), which includes Adaptive Variable Suspension, lighter 19-inch black BBS alloy wheels, Sport S and Sport S+ drive select modes, and carbon fibre rear spoiler, is available for the 2021 IS 350 F Sport. Newer IS models (2022 - present) may no longer have the carbon fiber spoiler or side mirror caps, although special blackout packages will add dark chrome window trim and black side mirror caps.

The IS, along with the CT and RC, was discontinued in Europe in 2020 due to poor sales figures, fierce competition from European rivals, and a shift in the market towards crossover SUVs. Following the introduction of stricter crash safety regulations, the IS, along with the CT hatchback and the RC coupe, were pulled out from the Australian market in November 2021.

In August 2022, the F Sport Mode Black III Package was released for the Japanese market IS 350, IS 300h, and IS 300. This package includes matte black BBS forged aluminium wheels, black door mirror covers, black stainless steel window molding, triple-eye full LED headlamps, and black Ultrasuede sport seats.

Continuing the F Sport Mode Black line up, the F Sport Mode Black IV Package was launched in January 2025. Available for the Japanese market IS 300 and IS 300h, this limited edition is similar to the previous Mode Black III Package.

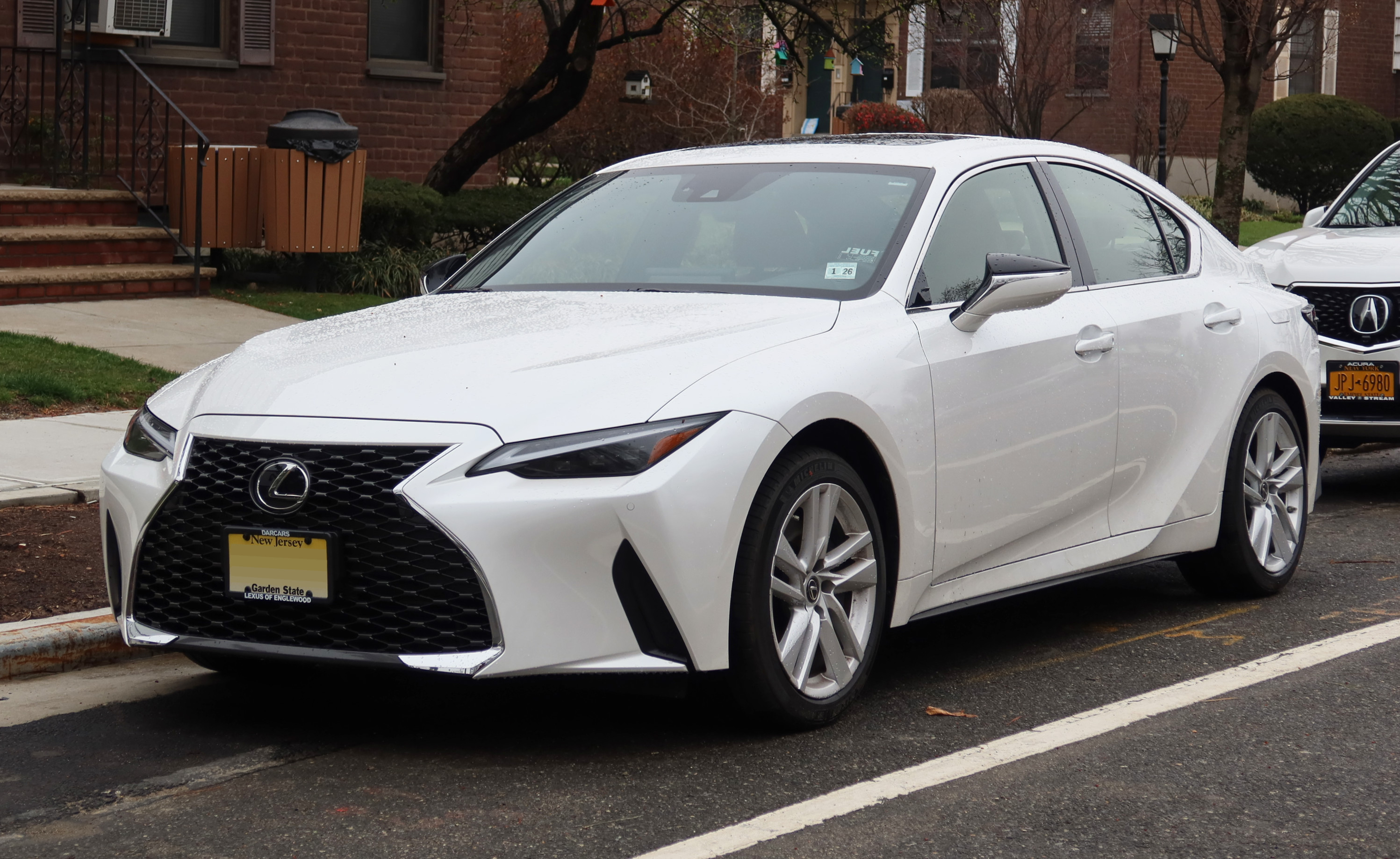
2021 Lexus IS 300 AWD (GSE37, US)

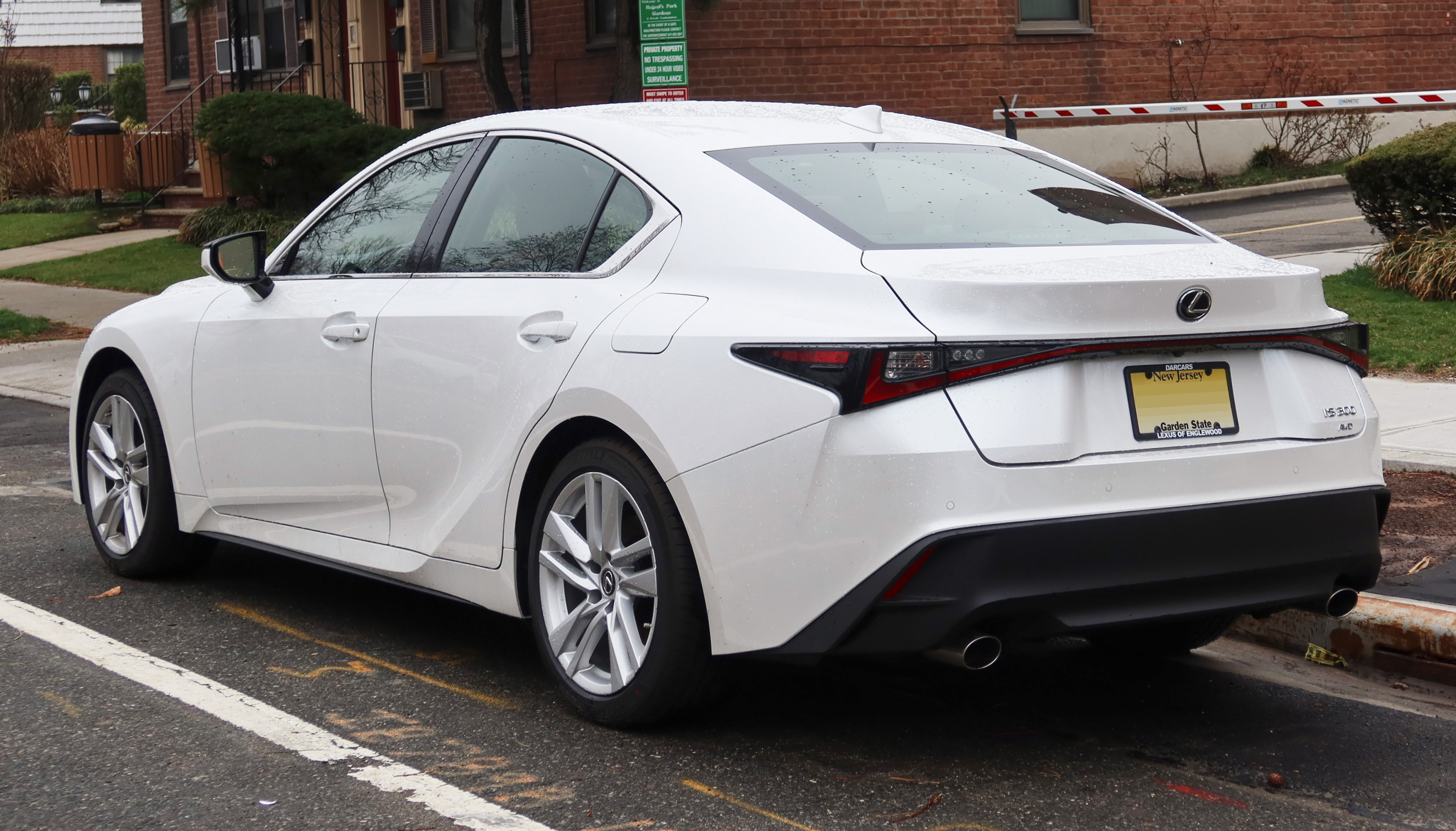
2021 Lexus IS 300 AWD (GSE37, US)

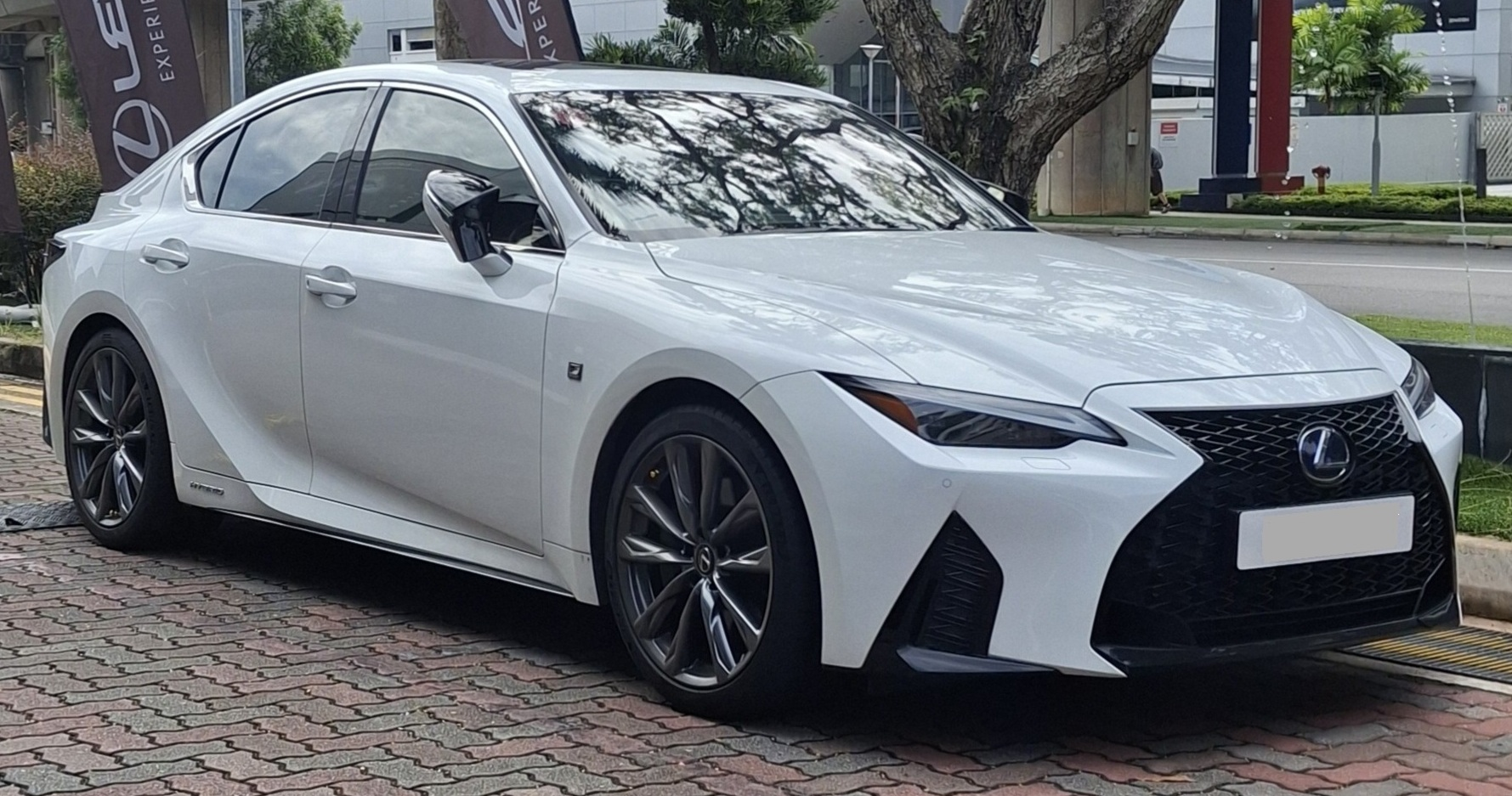
2021 Lexus IS 300h F Sport (AVE30, Singapore)

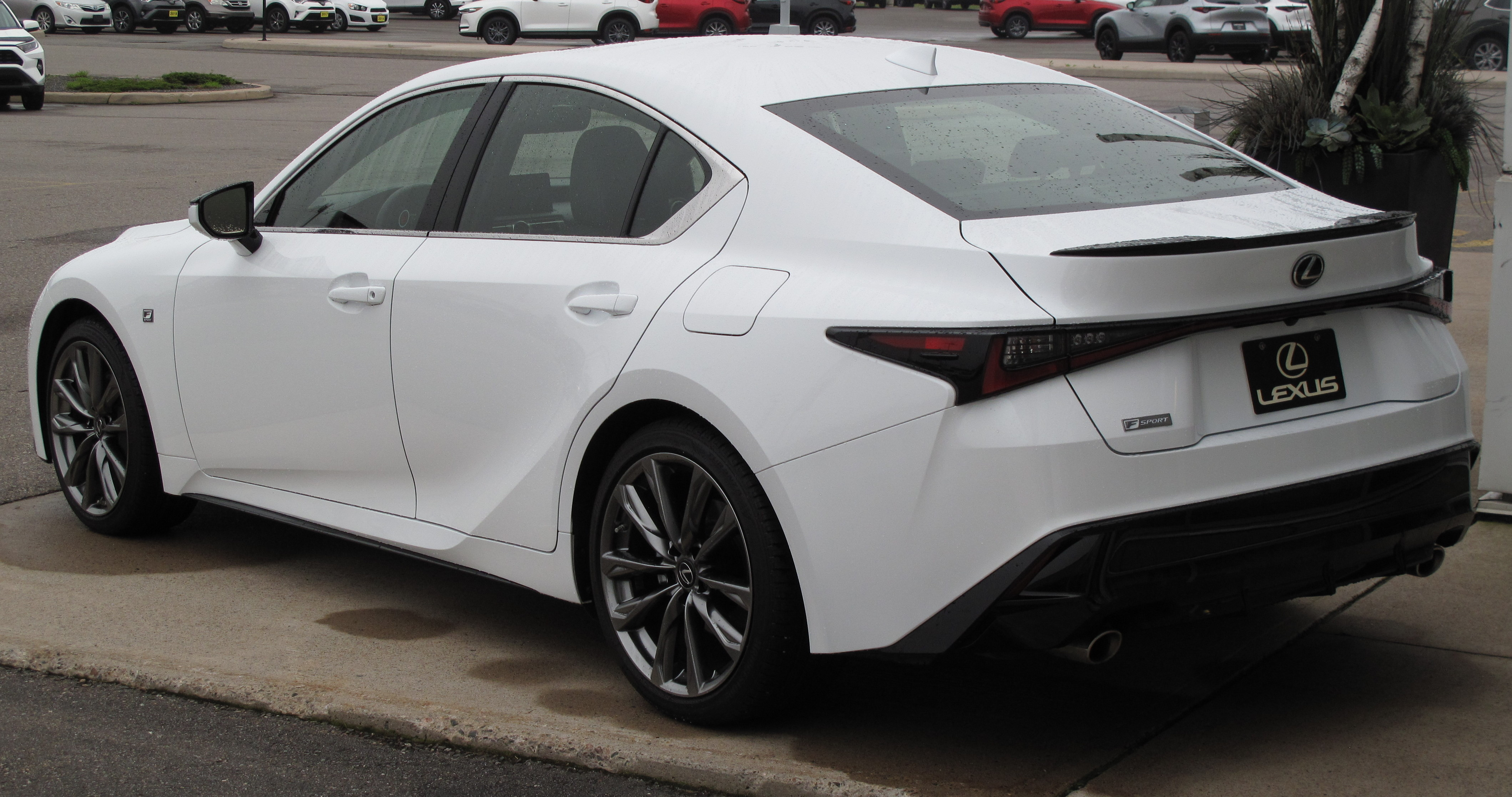
2021 Lexus IS 300 F Sport (ASE30, Canada)

==== IS 500 F Sport Performance ====
In February 2021, for the 2022 model year, the first V8-powered model since the IS F, called the IS 500 F Sport Performance, was unveiled and went on sale exclusively in North America in the third quarter of 2021. The IS 500 F Sport Performance is offered rear-wheel drive only and features the same 5.0 L (4,969 cc) 2UR-GSE engine offered in the IS F, RC F, GS F, and LC 500, rated at 472 horsepower and 395 lb⋅ft of torque in this version. This is the first Lexus model classified as "F Sport Performance", signifying a new class of model that offers the power output and engine of higher "F" marque models, but without the wider body, interior appointments such as sport bucket seats, nor extensively upgraded and tuned brakes, suspension, and chassis.

Distinguishing it from other IS F Sport models, the IS 500 F Sport Performance includes a raised bonnet bulge for the larger V8 engine, stacked quad exhaust tips, Yamaha rear performance dampers, F Sport–tuned Adaptive Variable Suspension, two-piece aluminium 14.0-in front and 12.7-in rear brake rotors, dark chrome window trim, F Sport Performance front door-sill scuff plates, IS 500 startup animation in multi-information display, and F Sport Performance 19-in staggered-width split-10-spoke Enkei alloy wheels, with optional 19-in split-seven-spoke forged alloy Matte Black BBS wheels. For 2023, the IS 500 F Sport Performance Premium offers an exclusive Special Appearance Package with Molten Pearl exterior paint, Black NuLuxe interior, 19-inch Matte Black BBS forged alloy wheels, unique colour-matched floor-trimmed mats and matching key gloves.

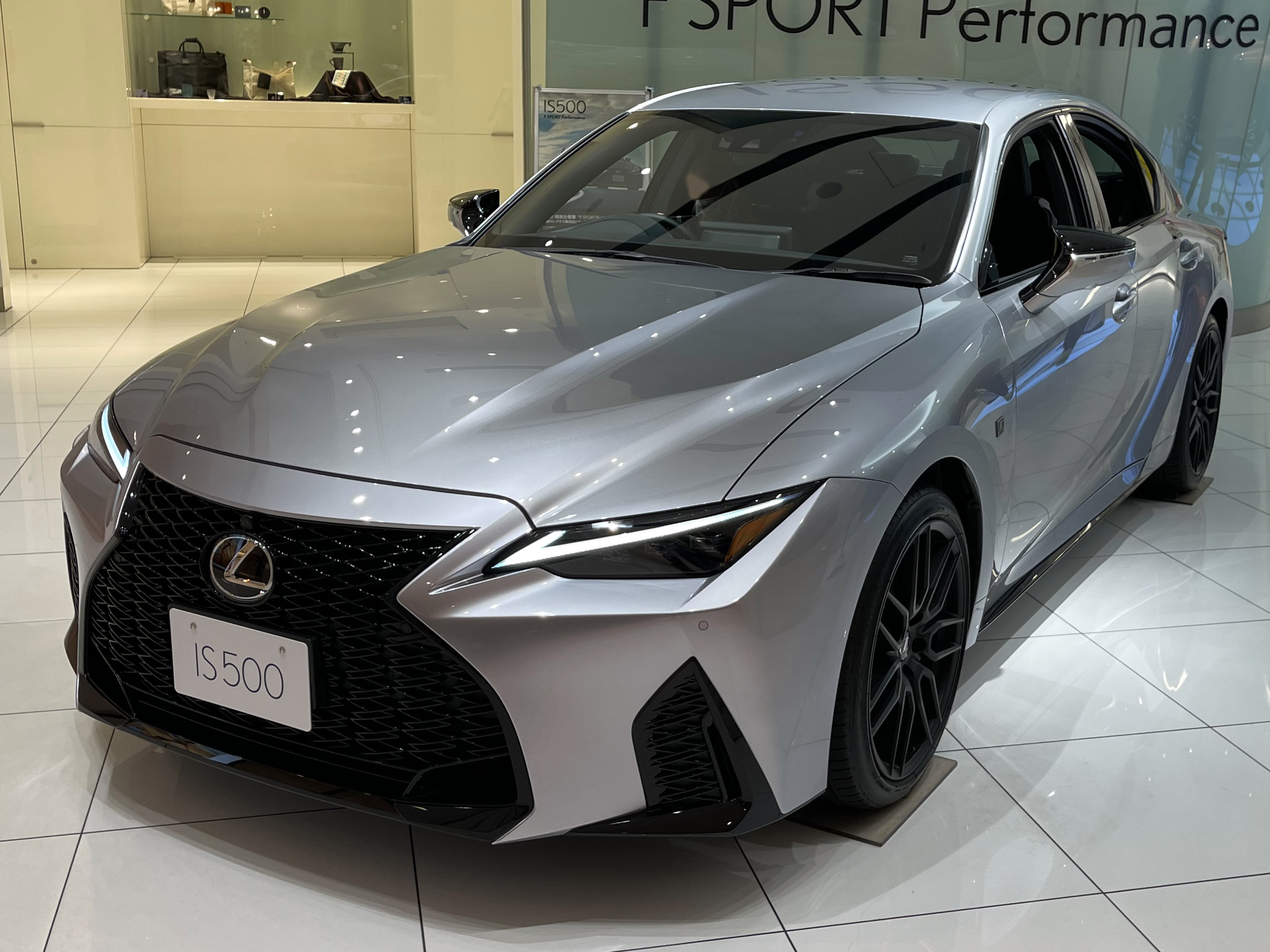
2022 Lexus IS 500 F-Sport Performance (USE30)

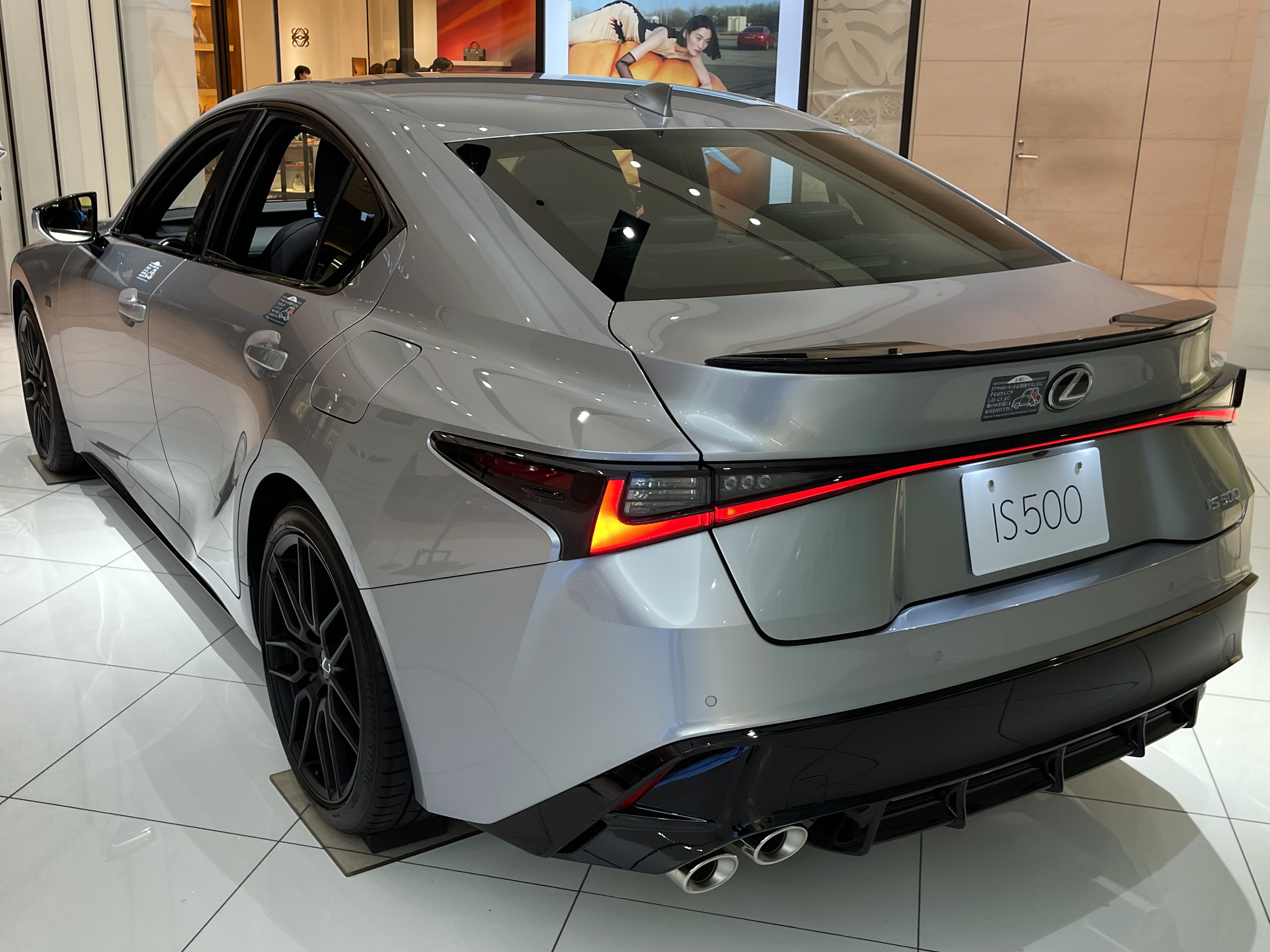
2022 Lexus IS 500 F-Sport Performance (USE30)

In May 2025, the IS 500 Ultimate Edition was announced for the North American market. Limited to 500-units, this model features red Brembo 6-pistons aluminium calipers paired with high-friction brake pads and large 380 mm pillar-fin ventilated disc brakes. It also comes with matte black 19-inch BBS forged alloy wheels for reduced weight, increased agility, and enhanced style. Inside, the IS 500 Ultimate Edition has Circuit Red and Black combination of NuLuxe and Ultrasuede seats, dimple-texture genuine leather steering wheel and shift knob, red seatbelts, an analogue clock with multi-layered dial finished with precision red laser etching, and Ultimate Edition badges on center console and scuff plates.

=== 2025 facelift ===
The third-generation IS received its third facelift on 9 September 2025. Changes include a redesigned front fascia, new rear spoiler, a redesigned interior, 12.3-inch central display, digital instrument cluster, and modernised driver-assist technologies, while the CD player, track pad, and analogue clock have been removed. Mechanically, the electric power steering now features a variable gear ratio to reduce steering angle at intersections and through corners.

For the US market, the IS range has been trimmed down to the IS 350 RWD and AWD models, and will only be available in F Sport Design and F Sport model grades.

Based on the F Sport, the 350 units limited edition F Sport Special Appearance Package came with Hakugin Matte White paint, black 19-inch forged BBS alloy wheels, triple-beam LED headlamps, and Torsen rear limited-slip differential (LSD). Inside, it has white and black NuLuxe seating trim and 17-speaker Mark Levinson Premium Surround Sound System.

For the 2026 model year in Canada, only the AWD IS 350 is offered with the choice of optional F Sport Design, F Sport 2, or F Sport 3 trim levels.

The Lexus IS range in Japan was also trimmed down to only the IS 300h, but buyers in Japan can choose the IS 300h as the base, L, F Sport, and F Sport Mode Black VI versions.

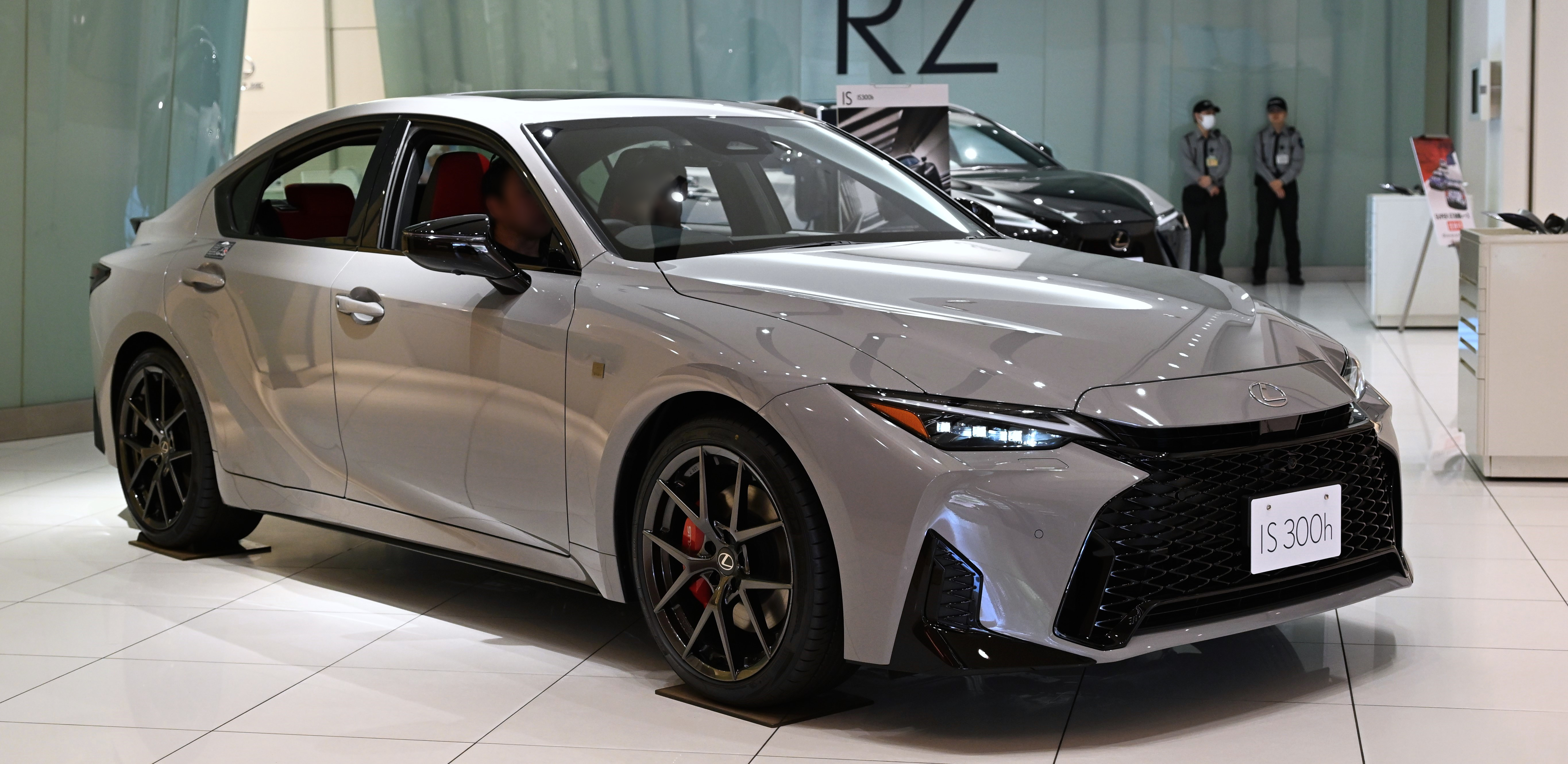
2026 Lexus IS 300h F-Sport

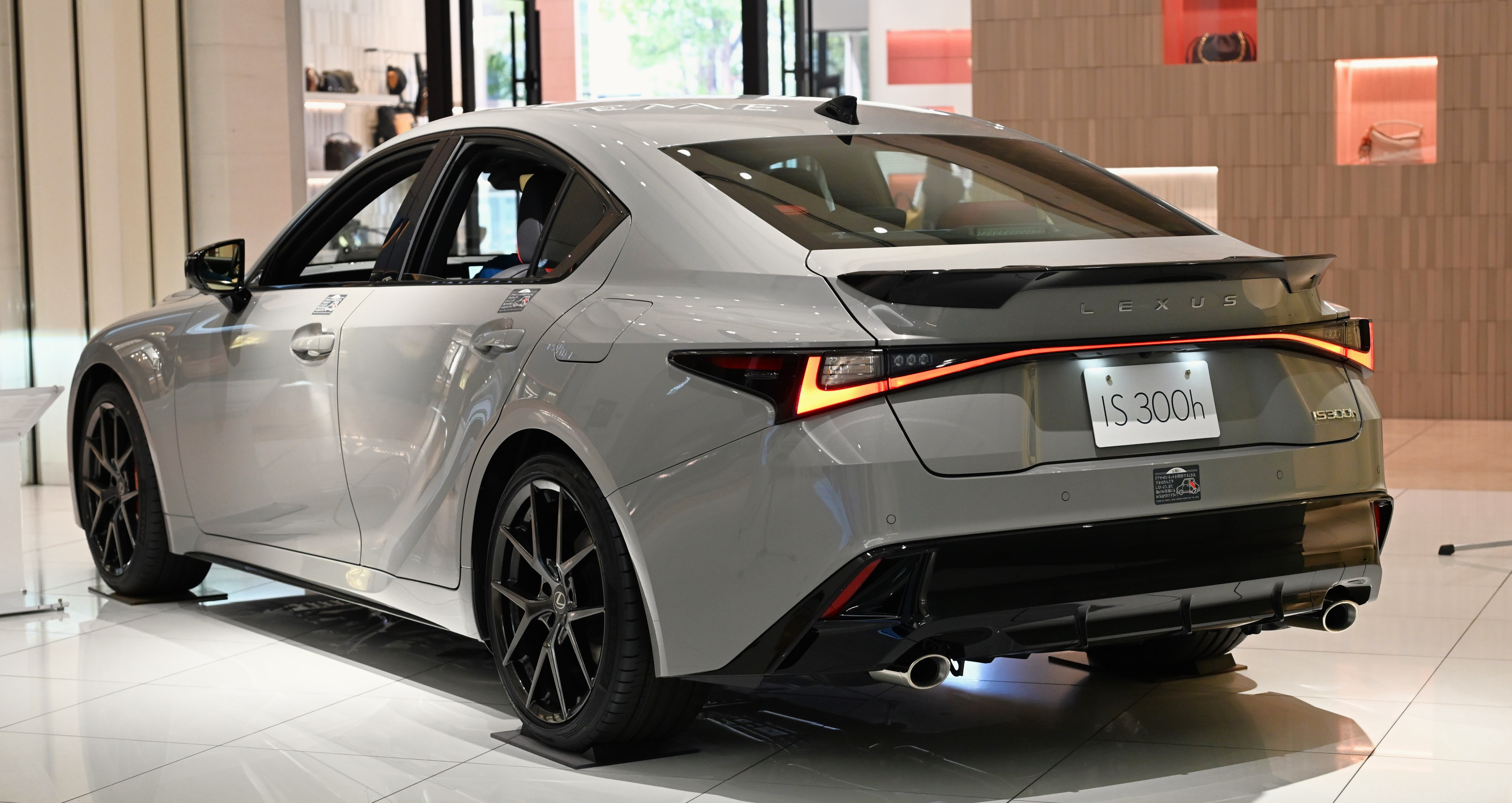
Rear view

=== Equipment ===
Toyota Racing Development (TRD) F Sport parts for the Japanese IS sedan include a front spoiler, side skirts, rear spoiler, sport muffler and rear diffuser, diamond-like carbon fibre shock absorbers, 19-inch aluminium wheels (measuring 19x8.5J front and 19x9J rear, 45 mm front and 50 mm rear insets, 245/35ZR19 front and 265/30ZR19 rear tyres), member brace and performance dampers.

=== Variants ===
Model	Calendar years
IS 250 (GSE30)	2013–2015
IS 250 AWD (GSE35)	2013–2015
IS 200t (ASE30)	2015–2017
IS 300 (ASE30)	2017–present
IS 300h AWD (AVE35)	2015–present
IS 300 AWD (GSE37)	2015–present
IS 300h (AVE30)	2013–present
IS 350 (GSE31)	2013–present
IS 350 AWD (GSE36)	2013–present
IS 500 F Sport Performance (USE30)	2021–2025

=== Powertrains ===
Petrol and hybrid engines
Model	Calendar years	Type/code	Power			at rpm	Torque			at rpm
Model	Calendar years	Type/code	PS	kW	hp	at rpm	kg·m	N·m	lb·ft	at rpm
IS 250	2013–2015	2,499 cc (152.5 cu in) V6 (4GR-FSE)	207	152	204	6,400	25.5	250	184	4,800
IS 250 AWD	2013–2015	2,499 cc (152.5 cu in) V6 (4GR-FSE)	207	152	204	6,400	25.5	250	184	3,800
IS 200t	2015–2017	1,998 cc (121.9 cu in) I4-T (8AR-FTS)	244	179	241	4,800–5,600	35.73	350	258	1,650–4,800
IS 300	2017–2025	1,998 cc (121.9 cu in) I4-T (8AR-FTS)	244	179	241	4,800–5,600	35.73	350	258	1,650–4,800
IS 300 AWD	2015–2025	3,456 cc (210.9 cu in) V6 (2GR-FSE/2GR-FKS)	259	190	255	6,400	32.6	320	236	2,000–4,800
IS 350	2013–present	3,456 cc (210.9 cu in) V6 (2GR-FSE/2GR-FKS)	315	232	311	6,600	38.8	380	281	4,800
IS 350 AWD	2013–present	3,456 cc (210.9 cu in) V6 (2GR-FSE/2GR-FKS)	315	232	311	6,600	38.8	380	281	4,800
IS 300h/ IS 300h AWD	2013–present/ 2015-present	2,494 cc (152.2 cu in) I4 (2AR-FSE)	178	131	176	6,400	22.5	221	163	4,200–5,400
IS 300h/ IS 300h AWD	2013–present/ 2015-present	1KM electric motor	143	105	141		30.6	300	221	
IS 300h/ IS 300h AWD	2013–present/ 2015-present	Combined	223	164	220					
IS 500 F Sport Performance	2021–2025	4,969 cc (303.2 cu in) V8 (2UR-GSE)	479	352	472	7,100	54.6	535	395	4,800

=== Transmissions ===
Petrol engines
Model	Calendar years	Types
IS 250	2013–2015	6-speed automatic (6 Super ECT/ECT-i) (A960E)
IS 250 AWD	2013–2015	6-speed automatic (6 Super ECT) (A760H)
IS 300 AWD	2016–present	6-speed automatic (6 Super ECT) (A760H)
IS 200t	2015–2017	8-speed automatic (8-Speed Sport Direct Shift/ECT-i/SPDS) (AA81E)
IS 300	2017–present	8-speed automatic (8-Speed Sport Direct Shift/ECT-i/SPDS) (AA81E)
IS 350	2013–present	8-speed automatic (8-Speed Sport Direct Shift/ECT-i/SPDS) (AA81E)
IS 350 AWD	2013–present	6-speed automatic (6 Super ECT) (A760H)
IS 300h	2013–present	Electronic CVT (L210)
IS 300h AWD	2015-present	Electronic CVT (L210F)
IS 500	2021–present	8-speed Sport Direct Shift automatic (AA80E)

=== Production ===
Production at the Tahara plant in Japan began on 25 April 2013.

As of June 2013, sales of the Lexus IS had reached 1,919 units.

Between 16 May 2013 and 16 June 2013, the order of IS sedans reached approximately 7,600 units, including 2,100 IS 250 and IS 350, 5,500 IS 300h models.

=== Safety ===
ANCAP test results Lexus IS Lexus IS 250, IS 350, IS 300h and IS 200t variants (2015)
Test	Score
Overall	5 /5 stars
Frontal offset	14/16
Side impact	16/16
Pole	2/2
Seat belt reminders	3/3
Whiplash protection	Good
Pedestrian protection	Good
Electronic stability control	Standard

ANCAP test results Lexus IS all variants (2016)
Test	Score
Overall	5 /5 stars
Frontal offset	14/16
Side impact	16/16
Pole	2/2
Seat belt reminders	3/3
Whiplash protection	Good
Pedestrian protection	Good
Electronic stability control	Standard

== Motorsport ==
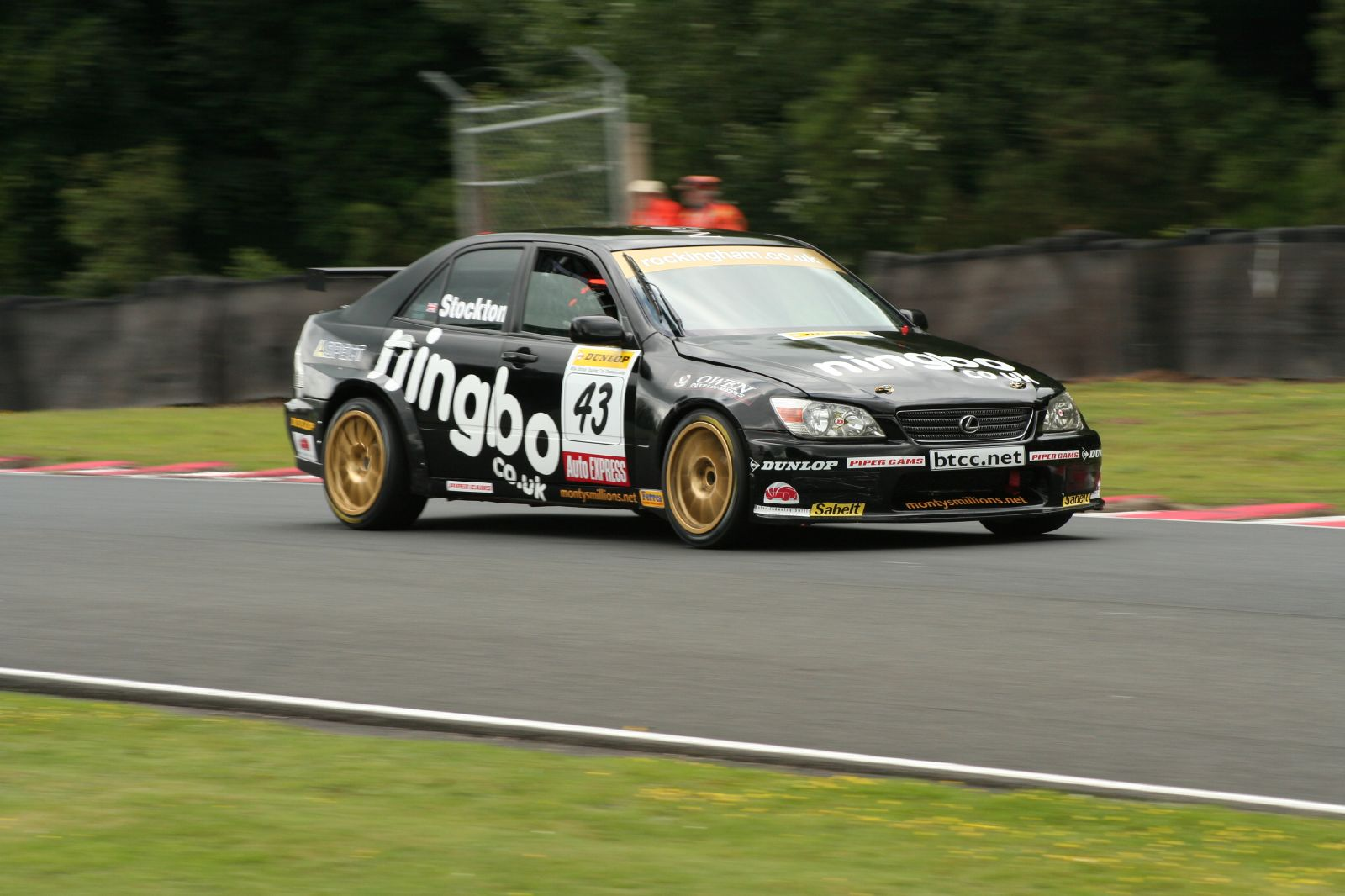
Chris Stockton's IS200 in Oulton Park during the 2007 BTCC season.

The first-generation IS 200/300 and RS200 series was used by many racing teams, including Toyota Racing Development, Endless, TOM'S, APEXi, and Amuse to race in various touring car racing series across Asia, including an Altezza one-make racing series in Japan. In Europe, the Lexus IS 200 was raced in the British Touring Car Championship (through organizations such as BTC Racing), and the IS 300 was raced in the US via the Motorola Cup North American Street Stock Championship touring car series (with the manufacturer-sanctioned Team Lexus).

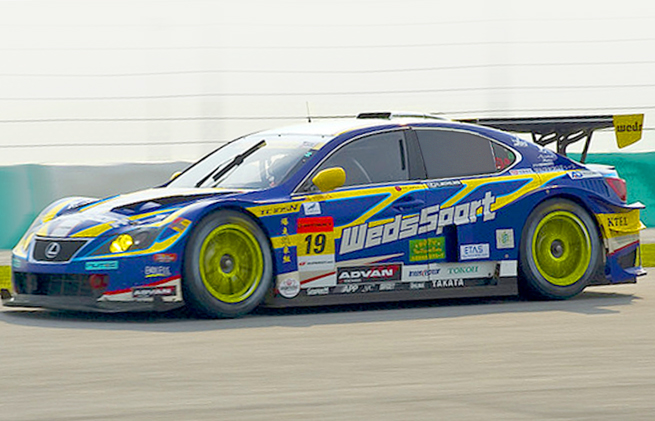
IS 350 WedsSport Bandoh race car which competed in the 2008 GT300 season and won the 2009 GT300 class.

In 2001, Team Lexus entered three IS 300s in the third race of the 2001 Grand-Am Cup season at Phoenix, Arizona, and won their first IS 300 victory that year at the Virginia International Raceway. In 2002, Team Lexus raced the IS 300 in the Grand-Am Cup ST1 (Street Tuner) class, winning both the Drivers' and Team Championships, as well as a sweep of the top three finishes at Circuit Mont-Tremblant in Quebec, Canada.

In 2008, the second-generation IS 350 was entered in the Super GT race series in the GT300 class (cars with approximately 300 hp (224 kW)). The No. 19 Racing Project Bandoh IS 350 driven by Manabu Orido and Tsubasa Abe achieved its first victory in its fifth race at the Motegi GT300 race. In 2009, The Project Bandoh WedsSport IS 350, driven by Manabu Orido and Tatsuya Kataoka, won both driver and team title in the GT300 class that season.

In April 2009, a Lexus IS F entered by Gazoo Racing finished second to the team's Lexus LF-A in the SP8 class in the ADAC-Westfalenfahrt VLN 4h endurance race. An IS F was also entered in the 2009 24 Hours Nürburgring race and finished third in the SP8 class. In August 2009, an IS F entered by Gazoo Racing and driven by Peter Lyon, Hideshi Matsuda, and Kazunori Yamauchi won the SP8 class at the DMV Grenzlandrennen VLN race. Kazunori Yamauchi is the developer of Gran Turismo series, of which the IS line is playable in several versions, and the IS F racer carried test equipment for future game modes. The 3 drivers, along with Owen Mildenhall, participated in the 2010 24 Hours Nürburgring and finished in 4th place in the SP8 class, behind the 1st place ranked Lexus LFA.

In 2012, Japanese drift racer Daigo Saito entered an IS 250 C in the Formula Drift Asia series. The car, which was a victim of the 2011 Japan earthquake and tsunami and due to be scrapped, was purchased by Saito and heavily customized for drift racing use. The most notable modification was the swapping of the stock engine to a 2JZ-GTE from a 4th generation Toyota Supra.

A race car based on the Lexus LF-CC entered the 2014 Super GT GT500 class, replacing the SC 430. Vehicle shakedown began at the Suzuka Circuit. The car was renamed after the RC F prior to the start of the season.

== Sales and production ==
Sales data for Lexus IS generations are as follows, with chart numbers sourced from manufacturer yearly data.

Generation (chassis code)	Names	Calendar year	Sales			Total exports, production^{‡}
Generation (chassis code)	Names	Calendar year	US	Japan	Other	Total exports, production^{‡}
GXE10, SXE10	Altezza AS 200/RS 200	1998	0	?	?	?
GXE10, SXE10	Altezza AS 200/RS 200/ IS 200	1999	0	?	?	?
GXE10, SXE10, JCE10	Altezza AS 200/300/RS 200/ IS 200/300	2000	15,540	?	?	?
GXE10, SXE10, JCE10	Altezza AS 200/300/RS 200/ IS 200/300	2001	22,486	?	?	30,475
GXE10, SXE10, JCE10, JCE15	Altezza AS 200/300/RS 200/ IS 200/300/SportCross	2002	20,306	?	?	23,749
GXE10, SXE10, JCE10, JCE15	Altezza AS 200/300/RS 200/ IS 200/300/SportCross	2003	13,559	?	?	14,187
GXE10, SXE10, JCE10, JCE15	Altezza AS 200/300/RS 200/ IS 200/300/SportCross	2004	9,972	?	?	11,114
GXE10, SXE10, JCE10, JCE15, ALE20, GSE20, GSE21, GSE22, GSE25	Altezza AS 200/300/RS 200/ IS 200/300/SportCross/ IS 220d/250/300/350	2005	15,789	3,911	?	10,253
ALE20, GSE20, GSE21, GSE22, GSE25	IS 220d/250/300/350	2006	54,267	10,727	?	109,720^{‡}
ALE20, GSE20, GSE21, GSE22, GSE25, USE20	IS 220d/250/300/350/F	2007	54,933	9,514	?	110,907^{‡}
ALE20, GSE20, GSE21, GSE22, GSE25, USE20	IS 220d/250/300/350/F	2008	49,432	10,110	?	93,612^{‡}
ALE20, GSE20, GSE21, GSE22, GSE25, USE20	IS 220d/250/300/350/ IS 250C/300C/350C/F	2009	38,077	5,278	?	43,369^{‡}
ALE20, GSE20, GSE21, GSE22, GSE25, GSE26, USE20	IS 200d/220d/250/300/350/ IS 250C/300C/350C/F	2010	34,129	?	?	?
ALE20, GSE20, GSE21, GSE22, GSE25, GSE26, USE20	IS 200d/220d/250/300/350/ IS 250C/300C/350C/F	2011	29,669	?	?	?
ALE20, GSE20, GSE21, GSE22, GSE25, GSE26, USE20	IS 200d/220d/250/300/350/ IS 250C/300C/350C/F	2012	27,708	?	?	?
GSE20, GSE21, GSE22, GSE25, GSE26, USE20, AVE30, GSE30, GSE31, GSE35, GSE36	IS 250/300/300h/350/ IS 250C/300C/350C/F	2013	35,017	?	?	?
GSE20, GSE21, GSE22, USE20, AVE30, GSE30 GSE31, GSE35, GSE36	IS 250/300/300h/350/ IS 250C/300C/350C/F	2014	51,358	?	?	?
GSE20, GSE21, GSE22, ASE30, AVE30, AVE35, GSE30, GSE31, GSE35, GSE36, GSE37	IS 200t/250/300/300h/350/ IS250C/300C/350C	2015	46,430	?	?	?
ASE30, AVE30, AVE35, GSE31, GSE36, GSE37	IS 200t/300/300h/350	2016	37,289	?	?	?
ASE30, AVE30, AVE35, GSE31, GSE36, GSE37	IS 300/300h/350	2017	26,482	?	?	?
ASE30, AVE30, AVE35, GSE31, GSE36, GSE37	IS 300/300h/350	2018	22,927	?	?	?
ASE30, AVE30, AVE35, GSE31, GSE36, GSE37	IS 300/300h/350	2019	14,920	?	?	?
ASE30, AVE30, AVE35, GSE31, GSE36, GSE37	IS 300/300h/350	2020	13,600	?	?	?
ASE30, AVE30, AVE35, GSE31, GSE36, GSE37, USE30	IS 300/300h/350/500	2021	21,998	?	?	?
ASE30, AVE30, AVE35, GSE31, GSE36, GSE37, USE30	IS 300/300h/350/500	2022	21,386	?	?	?
ASE30, AVE30, AVE35, GSE31, GSE36, GSE37, USE30	IS 300/300h/350/500	2023	22,521	?	?	?
ASE30, AVE30, AVE35, GSE31, GSE36, GSE37, USE30	IS 300/300h/350/500	2024	18,946	?	?	?
ASE30, AVE30, AVE35, GSE31, GSE36, GSE37, USE30	IS 300/300h/350/500	2025	19,714	?	?	?

== Awards ==
- J.D. Power and Associates named the second-generation IS 250/IS 350 sedans the best vehicles in the entry luxury class in its 2006 Initial Quality Survey.
- J.D. Power and Associates named the first-generation IS 300 sedan and IS 300 SportCross the best vehicles in the entry luxury class in its 2005 Initial Quality Survey.
- Ward's Auto bestowed the IS 350 V6 engine with one of its 10 Best Engines awards in 2006. The IS 350 V6 engine was also named to Ward's 10 Best Engines list in 2007, 2008, and 2009.
- The 2007 Lexus IS was the winner of the Intellichoice/AutoPacific Motorist Choice Award for Aspirational Luxury Cars, referring to the vehicle owners most desired in the luxury segment.
- The Lexus IS was named the winner of the 2007 IF product design award from the International Forum Design group in Hannover, Germany.
- The 2007 Lexus IS was the winner of the Golden Steering Wheel Award in the Luxury category, according to German newspaper, Bild am Sonntag. This award, selected by a jury panel of 25 automotive experts, was presented to Lexus in a Berlin ceremony.
- British automotive magazine Top Gear named the second-generation Lexus IS as the Executive Car of the Year in 2006.
- The Canadian Car of the Year Awards, selected by the Automobile Journalists Association of Canada, gave the IS 350 its Best New Technology award in 2006.
- The Lexus IS was a finalist for Wheels magazine's Car of the Year (COTY) awards and also the World Car of the Year (WCOTY) award in 2006.
- Kelley Blue Book gave the first-generation IS 300 its Best to Hold Value Award in 2001.
- The IS 250 was the winner in 2006 and 2007 of Best Prestige Car in the Australia's Best Cars awards – awarded by the conglomeration of all of Australia's respective State Automotive Associations.
- The Lexus IS came second in the Top Gear Satisfaction Survey 2005, beaten only by the Honda S2000.
- The Lexus IS came first in the 'J.D.Power' car satisfaction survey in 2011 and joint second in 2010.
