= Takayama =

Takayama may refer to:

== People ==
- Takayama (surname)

== Places ==
- Takayama, Gifu, a city
  - Takayama Castle
  - Takayama Festival
  - Takayama Jinya
  - Takayama Station, a railway station
- Takayama, Gunma, a village
- Takayama, Nagano, a village
- Takayama Main Line, a railway line

== Other ==
- Takayama, a shuttle craft in the movie Star Trek Into Darkness
- Takayama (dinoflagellate), a genus of dinoflagellates

== See also ==
- 高山 (disambiguation)
- Takiyama (disambiguation)
- Tamayama (disambiguation)
- Katayama, a Japanese surname
