= Masataka =

- Gender: Male

Origin
- Origin: Japanese
- Meaning: Different meanings depending on the kanji used

Masataka (written: 昌孝, 雅孝, 雅隆, 正隆, 正孝, 正崇, 正太, 正貴, 正尚, 政孝, 仁崇, 將貴, 昌隆, 真孝 or 真隆) is a masculine Japanese given name. Notable people with the name include:

- Masataka Azuma (我妻 正崇), Japanese voice actor
- Masataka Gōda (郷田 真隆; born 1971), Japanese shogi player
- Masataka Ida (井田 正孝; 1912–2004), Japanese rebel
- Masataka Imai (今井 雅隆; born 1959), Japanese footballer and manager
- Masataka Itsumi (逸見 政孝; 1945–1993), Japanese announcer, singer and writer
- Masataka Kawase (河瀬 真孝; 1840–1919), Japanese diplomat
- Masataka Kubota (窪田 正孝; born 1988), Japanese actor
- Masataka Matsutoya (松任谷 正隆; born 1951), Japanese musician, composer and singer-songwriter
- Masataka Mikami (三上 正貴; born 1988), Japanese rugby union player
- Masataka Morizono (森薗 政崇; born 1995), Japanese table tennis player
- Masataka Murata (村田 正太; 1884–1974), Japanese physician
- Masataka Nashida (梨田 昌孝; born 1953), Japanese baseball player and manager
- Masataka Ogawa (小川 正孝; 1865–1930), Japanese chemist
- Masataka Sakamoto (坂本 將貴; born 1978), Japanese footballer
- Masataka Shimizu (清水 政孝; born 1944), Japanese chief executive
- Masataka Sugimoto (杉本 昌隆; born 1968), Japanese shogi player
- Masataka Takayama (disambiguation), multiple people
- Masataka Taketsuru (竹鶴 政孝; 1894–1979), Japanese businessman
- Masataka Yanagida (柳田 真孝; born 1979), Japanese racing driver
- Masataka Yoshida (吉田 正尚; born 1993), Japanese baseball player

== Fictional characters ==
- Masataka Takayanagi (高柳 雅孝), a character in the manga series Tenjho Tenge
- Commander Masataka Shima, an IJN officer and the main antagonist of Medal of Honor: Rising Sun
