= List of Mobile Suit Gundam 00 characters =

This is a list of fictional characters from the Japanese anime television series, Mobile Suit Gundam 00, the eleventh incarnation of the Gundam media franchise.

== Celestial Being ==
=== Gundam Meisters ===
The series focuses on the four mobile suit pilots of the paramilitary organization Celestial Being. The pilots, referred to as Gundam Meisters (ガンダムマイスター, Gandamu Maisuta; German for Master), pursue the complete eradication of armed conflict mainly through the deployment of the revolutionary Gundam units in aggressive armed interventions.

Setsuna F. Seiei (刹那・F・セイエイ, Setsuna Efu Seiei)
Setsuna F. Seiei is the primary protagonist of the series and was discovered by Celestial Being at the age of 16 for having special potential as a pilot. He is currently a Gundam Meister and pilots Gundam Exia, specialized in melee combat. Setsuna's real name is Suran Ibrahim (ソラン・イブラヒム, Soran Iburahimu) (سوران إبراهيم Suran Ibrahim); with Setsuna F. Seiei being his codename. He was once a child soldier of Kurdish descent in the war-torn Krugis Republic. During this time, he murdered his own parents under Ali Al-Saachez's influence in order to prove his devotion to God, and hence bears a deep hatred towards Saachez. Due to his previous religious brainwashing (and awakening from it), Setsuna claims he no longer believes in God, yet still debates the role of God in people's lives, suggesting that he would like to believe in God. After going into hiding at the end of the first season, Setsuna reappears four years later and rejoins Celestial Being as the pilot of 00 Gundam during his fight with the Innovators and then 00 QAN[T] during his battle with the ELS. Disappearing at the end of the fight, Setsuna F. Seiei reappears decades later. Throughout the series he had a connection with Marina Ismail, though whether or not the connection was romantic was never truly explored, as it seems (from certain flashbacks) that Marina reminds him of his beloved mother whom he had to kill to join Ali Al-Saachez's guerrilla group when he was a child. Both deny romantic feelings when asked; nevertheless Marina is one of the most important people for Setsuna. Feldt Grace openly displayed romantic feelings for him in the movie. His last appearance is shown 50 years after his departure, paying a visit to a now elderly Marina Ismail who is almost blind, and she bursts into tears as soon as she hears his voice. Setsuna is shown to have become a Human-ELS hybrid and he seems to have not aged since he left. Setsuna F. Seiei is voiced by Mamoru Miyano and Yuka Nishigaki (child) in Japanese and Brad Swaile in English.
Lockon Stratos (ロックオン・ストラトス, Rokkuon Sutoratosu)

Neil Dylandy (ニール・ディランディ, Nīru Dirandi)
Neil Dylandy is the first Lockon Stratos who decided to join Celestial Being because his parents and younger sister were killed in a terrorist bombing. As the eldest pilot, he sports a more easy-going, flamboyant personality as compared to the other Gundam Meisters. He owns an orange Haro to help pilot the Gundam Dynames and has a personal feud with Ali Al-Saachez, who plotted the terrorist bombing that caused the death of his family. He acts as the leader of the team, becoming the closest friend to both Setsuna and Tieria, and lost his aiming eye shielding Tieria. Despite being injured, he searched for revenge against Ali Al-Saachez, and succeeds in shooting down Saachez's machine at the cost of his own life. His death is one of the biggest impacts to Setsuna and prompts him to "change" as Neil could not (which would develop into Setsuna becoming the first true Innovator). After being killed at the climax of the first season, his younger twin brother Lyle Dylandy chooses to take up the title of Lockon Stratos and becomes the pilot of the Cherudim Gundam. Neil Dylandy is voiced by Shinichiro Miki in Japanese and Alex Zahara in English.
Lyle Dylandy (ライル・ディランディ, Rairu Dirandi)
First seen in episode 9 of the first season visiting the grave site of his family. Four years after the death of Neil Dylandy, Setsuna F. Seiei recruits Neil's twin brother, Lyle, to become the new Lockon Stratos and pilot of the Cherudim Gundam. He is shown to be easy-going like his brother, but continues to struggle with distinguishing himself from Neil. He becomes romantically interested in the Innovator Anew Returner until she is killed by Setsuna, who was protecting Lyle from her in a brainwashed state. Originally a double agent from the anti-government organization Katharon, Lyle leaves Katharon and becomes a full-time member of Celestial Being at the end of the second season. During the events of the movie, Lyle pilots the Gundam Zabanya during the fight with the ELS. While Dynames and Cherudim both have a sniping scope trigger, Zabanya doesn't, as the first two were designed with Neil's Sniping Style, while Lyle is more of a "happy trigger" (despite the fact that his on-hit per shot ratio is incredibly high). Lyle Dylandy is voiced by Shinichiro Miki in Japanese and Alex Zahara in English.

Allelujah Haptism (アレルヤ・ハプティズム, Areruya Haputizumu)
Allelujah Haptism spent his childhood as an orphan in the Human Reform League as a Super Soldier experimental subject in a supersoldier project, designated "E-57", while his true name is forgotten, he is "baptised" by Marie Parfacy as "Allelujah" when they met for the first time when they were children at the Super Soldier Institute (at that moment Marie had lost her five senses so she was bedridden and could only communicate using her quantum brainwaves, with E-57 being the very first person who could hear and answer her, she gives him that name stating that they should be grateful to be alive). While generally gentle and rational compared to the other Gundam Meisters, the experiments and trauma of killing his fellow subjects in order to survive during their escape gone awry caused him to manifest a second personality in the form of Hallelujah (ハレルヤ, Hareruya), a bloodthirsty and outright sadistic personality. He is the pilot of Gundam Kyrios and later Gundam Arios, as well as one of the pilots of Gundam Harute, all of which specialize in high mobility and are able to transform into fighter jets. Allelujah's rival in combat is another subject of the Super Soldier program, Soma Peries whom he shared a deep connection with that Hallelujah realized long before he did. Though Allelujah managed to reach common ground with his alter ego to reach his full potential as a super soldier (Allelujah manages the tactical side of the battle, while Hallelujah manages the combat reflexes), Hallelujah "died" in battle against Soma as Allelujah recognizes Soma as Marie Parfacy, a fact that Hallelujah knew and kept hidden to protect Allelujah so he would continue to fight for their survival. Allelujah is captured and imprisoned during the four-year time-skip between both seasons, and ends up being rescued by his companions after the other three Meisters reunite. During his subsequent encounters with Soma, she reverts to being Marie, and Allelujah convinces her to join Celestial Being, with the two becoming lovers. During moments that he is near 00 Raiser's Trans-Am System, the Hallelujah persona resurfaces, and it is shown later that after being exposed to Setsuna's Trans-Am Burst the Hallelujah persona was fully restored and "resurrected". Despite Hallelujah acting like a bloodthirsty psychopath, he only acts when Allelujah is in danger of dying, acting as a last resort self-defense mechanism. While Hallelujah shouldn't be able to care for Marie (as a psychopath can't feel empathy), he does care for Allelujah's physical and emotional well-being, and will take over to ensure that Allelujah will be able to protect Marie. As with Soma Peries, it is shown that Hallelujah could easily take over the body and become the main personality but chose not to, preferring to remain in a dormant state. In the series aftermath, Allelujah and Marie have apparently left Celestial Being to find their place in the world. During the events of the movie, Allelujah and Marie rejoin Celestial Being to fight the ELS in the Gundam Harute, a dual piloted Mobile Suit. Allelujah has Heterochromia iridum; throughout the first season, his left gray eye represents his Allelujah personality and his right golden eye represents Hallelujah until the latter's destruction, after which both his eyes become visible. Allelujah Haptism is voiced by Hiroyuki Yoshino and Masako Jou (child) in Japanese and Richard Ian Cox in English.
Tieria Erde (ティエリア・アーデ, Tieria Āde)
Gundam Meister of the heavily armored Gundam Virtue/Nadleeh, its successor unit Gundam Seravee/Seraphim and finally the Gundam Raphael. Tieria treats Veda's orders with high regard, valuing the mission above all else. As a result of his arrogance and cold attitude towards others, his relationship with the other Gundam Meisters got off to a rocky start. However, his attitude towards the other Meisters and the Ptolemaios crew gradually improves after being protected by Lockon Stratos from an attack in a battle against the AEU and the Union, an action which costs Lockon the use of his dominant eye. Of all the Gundam Meisters, Tieria is the most enigmatic, with an unknown past and a peculiar connection with the Innovators. Contrary to the other Meisters who were either K.I.A. or M.I.A. by the end of the first season, Tieria continued to work for Celestial Being during the four-year time-skip. At the end of the second season, Tieria is killed by Ribbons Almark while trying to stop him from taking control of Veda. Tieria, however, manages to upload his consciousness into Veda itself, subsequently ending the battle by remote-controlling Seraphim from Veda's core and activating its Trial System to shut down all enemy mobile suits. He briefly returns in the movie in a new body and pilots Gundam Raphael briefly before sacrificing himself once more to save Setsuna. He eventually ends up uploaded into Setsuna's 00 Qan[T] and is last seen when the Gundam departs to the ELS homeworld. His fate is unknown, although the 00 Qan[T] returns to Earth in the epilogue and a Tieria-type Innovator briefly appears aboard the Sumeragi. While Tieria never showed romantic feelings for anyone (as he was completely focused on his mission) he starts to show care for others after Neil sacrifices his eye to shield him. Tieria develops a close bond to Neil, and in the second season after Neil's death when he doubts if he should tell his crewmates who are behind the A-Laws' schemes (as he is an Innovade too), the "ghost" of Neil comes to comfort him, stating that Aeolia gave the Gundams to them, the Gundam Meisters. While he never truly reciprocates her feelings, Mileina Vashti stated that no matter which form he takes she loves him. Tieria Erde is voiced by Hiroshi Kamiya in Japanese and Samuel Vincent in English.

=== Crew of the Ptolemaios ===
The crew of the Ptolemaios on the first season, clockwise from top-left: Lasse Aeon, Lockon Stratos, Setsuna F Seiei, Orange Haro, Tieria Erde, Allelujah Haptism, Joyce Moreno, Lichtendahl Tsery, Christina Sierra, Feldt Grace, Sumeragi Lee Noriega, Ian Vashti.

Supporting the Gundam Meisters is the crew of the Ptolemaios (プトレマイオス, Putoremaiosu) led by Sumeragi Lee Noriega. At the end of the first season, the Ptolemaios was severely damaged and many of its crew were killed. During the second season, the new Ptolemaios II enters service crewed by the surviving members of the original Ptolemaios. They are later joined by Saji Crossroad and Soma Peries, the latter after recovering her memory as Marie Parfacy.

Sumeragi Lee Noriega (スメラギ・李・ノリエガ, Sumeragi Ri Noriega)
Sumeragi is the tactical forecaster of the Celestial Being mothership Ptolemaios. As the most senior ranking officer on the ship, she is the de facto captain. She plans all the strategies the Gundam Meisters take part in, and her strategic predictions are almost always accurate. Her real name is Leesa Kujo (リーサ・クジョウ, Rīsa Kujō). In the beginning of the second season, Sumeragi is reluctant to rejoin the others until the encouragement from her companions helps her find the resolve to help them. At the end of the series, she remains with Celestial Being. Sumeragi Lee Noriega is voiced by Yōko Honna in Japanese and Lisa Ann Beley in English.
Saji Crossroad (沙慈・クロスロード, Saji Kurosurōdo)
Originally a civilian and a senior high school student studying aerospace engineering, Saji is also Setsuna F Seiei's neighbour at Setsuna's residence in Japan. Orphaned prior to the start of the series, Saji was cared for by his sister Kinue. A gentle person with a submissive personality, he is often pushed around by his overbearing girlfriend Louise Halevy and continued to make ends meet with a delivery job at a pizza parlor. Despite his unaggressive nature, Saji has been caught up in the wake of the Gundams' actions, with Louise suffering and Kinue dead. As a result, Saji has developed a deep hatred for the Gundams, blaming them for the loss of his loved ones as he leaves for space to live his dream as an engineer.
In the second season, after being arrested under false charges of Katharon involvement, Saji is saved by Setsuna and learns his identity as a Gundam Meister. After Celestial Being arrives at Katharon's secret base with the intention of leaving civilians Saji and Marina in their care, Saji secretly attempts to escape the base. He is almost immediately captured by the ESF army under Sergei Smirnov's charge, and he unwittingly leaks the whereabouts of Katharon base causing one of Sergei's men to leak it to the A-Laws. Sergei releases Saji so he doesn't fall into A-Laws hands, however, the A-Laws attack the Katharon base, which ends in the deaths of many of Katharon's members despite Celestial Being's intervention to stop the attack. The slaughter deeply upsets Saji until Tieria forces Saji to realize that turning his back to ignore problems is its own kind of malice. Because Saji's actions led to the destruction of the Katharon base, Tieria forces Saji to remain with the Ptolemaios crew and no longer trusts Saji's judgment. While on the Ptolemaios II, he reluctantly becomes a part of the crew and learns the truth behind the events from years ago and the motivations of the Gundam Meisters, allowing him to abandon his grudge and eventually understanding Celestial Being. When Ian is critically injured during a battle, he directs Saji to deliver the GNR-010 0 Raiser to Setsuna, so the meister can unlock 00 Gundam's true power to save the lives of the Ptolemaios crew. As the 0 Raiser's pilot, Saji must continue going into battle alongside Setsuna, during which he learns of Louise being part of the A-Laws, and chooses to fight to save her. By the end of the series, Saji leaves Celestial Being and watches over Louise while she is recovering at a hospital, where they talk about humanity's future.
Two years later, Saji continues to care and attend to a PTSD-plagued Louise. When the Earth Sphere Government ask for engineers to help in the Orbital Ring maintenance, he volunteers with Louise's encouragement. His last appearance in the movie is while Setsuna's consciousness is drifting and watching every person he holds dear, with Saji working as an engineer while ELS drones are shown in the background. Saji Crossroad is voiced by Miyu Irino in Japanese and Gabe Khouth in English.
Feldt Grace (フェルト・グレイス, Feruto Gureisu)
Feldt is the daughter of Ruido Resonance and Marlene Vlady, who initially worked under Celestial Being as Meisters for the 2nd-generation GNY-series Gundam prototypes and later got married. In the beginning of the series, Feldt works as the tactical operator of Ptolemaios and later the Ptolemaios II. In addition to her programming skills, Feldt is also a capable mechanic. Though she tends to be reserved, she reagrds all the members of Celestial Being as her family. She is strongly implied to have had a crush on Neil Dylandy until the latter's death, but between the end of the second season and the movie, she openly develops romantic feelings for Setsuna. Feldt Grace is voiced by Ayahi Takagaki in Japanese and Chantal Strand in English.
Christina Sierra (クリスティナ・シエラ, Kurisutina Shiera)
Christina Sierra is the Ptolemaios tactical operator. Christina ran away from her adopted mother before being discovered by Celestial Being. She becomes good friends with crewmate Feldt. During the battle at Lagrange point 1, the bridge of Ptolemaios is attacked by a GN-X. Although Lichtendahl Tsery shielded her from the attack, she is fatally wounded by a shred of metal from the shattered bridge. Before Lichty dies in her arms, she realizes her own feelings for him. She contacts the surviving crewmembers and tells Feldt to live on for Lockon's memory, before dying in the subsequent explosion. Christina Sierra is voiced by Arise Satō in Japanese and Shannon Chan-Kent in English.
Lichtendahl Tsery (リヒテンダール・ツエーリ, Rihitendāru Tsuēri)
Lichtendahl Tsery, called Lichty by his crewmates, is the Ptolemaios helmsman. Lichty's parents were technicians on one of the orbital elevators and killed during the Solar Wars, while he lost a large portion of his body which was replaced with cybernetics. Although Lichty has a romantic interest in crewmate Christina, she maintains a friendly and professional relationship. During the battle at Lagrange point 1, the bridge of Ptolemaios is attacked by a GN-X, Lichty is fatally wounded while shielding Christina from the explosion. He soon dies in Christina's arms after she realizes her own feelings for him. Lichtendahl Tsery is voiced by Masataka Azuma in Japanese and David A. Kaye in English.
Lasse Aeon (ラッセ・アイオン, Rasse Aion)
Initially, Lasse served as the gunner for the Celestial Being mothership Ptolemaios. He also piloted the GNR-001 GN Arms, a transformable weapon docking system for the four Gundams. In the final battle with the UN forces, Lasse helps Setsuna fight Alejandro Corner in the Alvatore/Alvaaron. Though he survives the battle, his health suffers from overexposure to Fake GN particles. In the second season, he serves as the Ptolemaios II main helmsman, but during the season's final battle he briefly pilots the 0 Gundam until it runs out of power. At the end of the season, Lasse remains part of Celestial Being. In the Gundam 00 Movie he has fully recovered from the overexposure thanks to Setsuna's Trans Am burst at the end of the second season. Lasse Aeon is voiced by Hiroki Touchi in Japanese and Andrew Francis in English.
Joyce Moreno (ジョイス・モレノ, Joisu Moreno)
Joyce Moreno is the Ptolemaios doctor and longtime friend of crewmate Ian Vashti from before both joined Celestial Being. Fifteen years earlier, he was a member of Doctors without Borders and began referring to himself as "JB Moreno." He is killed when the Alvatore fires upon the Ptolemaios and destroys the medical bay. Joyce Moreno is voiced by Go Shinomiya in Japanese and Brian Drummond in English.
Ian Vashti (イアン・ヴァスティ, Ian Vasuti)
Ian Vashti is the head of Celestial Being's mobile suit development along with his wife and daughter. On the Ptolemaios, Ian works as the ship's main engineer. He is a kind hearted man, but gets angry when his machines are damaged. Later on in the series he also becomes one of the main Gunners of the Ptolemaios II. Ian Vashti is voiced by Hideyuki Umezu in Japanese and Peter New in English.
Mileina Vashti (ミレイナ・ヴァスティ, Mireina Vasuti)
Mileina Vashti is Ian's and Linda's daughter who joins the crew of the Ptolemaios II before the beginning of the second season. Despite her young age, she is a gifted technician, learning much about engineering, GN Technology and programming from both her parents. Mileina normally staffs the tactical operations station, but she also helps her father as a mechanic, and even temporarily takes over his role when he heads to Celestial Being's L3 base ahead of the Ptolemaios II. In the movie, she openly declares her love to Tieria just prior to the latter leaving for the final battle and subsequently the ELS homeworld, though it's unknown if they develop a relationship or not. Mileina Vashti is voiced by Haruka Tomatsu in Japanese and Andrea Libman in English.
Linda Vashti (リンダ・ヴァスティ, Rinda Vasuti)
Linda Vashti is Ian's wife, and mother to Mileina. She appears in the background of episode 2 of the second season, but does not make a proper appearance until Ian later travels to space in episode 9 to retrieve the 0 Raiser. Linda later delivers supplies and new equipment for the Gundams and the 0 Gundam to Ptolemaios II, and joins Ian in the weapons control room. Linda Vashti is voiced by Risa Hayamizu in Japanese and Jillian Michaels in English.

=== Other members of Celestial Being ===
Aeolia Schenberg (イオリア・シュヘンベルグ, Ioria Shuhenberugu)
Living over 200 years before the beginning of the series, Aeolia Schenberg establishes the theoretical basis of the combined orbital elevator and photovoltaic energy system, the construction and defense of which he foresaw to employ humanoid machines not unlike mobile suits. In a long-term plan to rid the world of armed conflict and ready humanity for the next phase of its evolution, Aeolia founds the private paramilitary organization Celestial Being and develops the technology behind the GN Drives. It is this plan that becomes the driving force for both the first and second series. Schenberg's body is held in cryogenic stasis within Veda, intending to awaken when the world is rid of conflict. However, soon after this discovery near the end of the first series, Alejandro Corner kills Schenberg in order to take over the plan. Schenberg's death triggers a system trap that activates the Trans-Am System in the four Gundams Original Solar Furnaces' Black Boxes, completely purges the personal data of the four Gundam Meisters and unlocks the secrets behind the Twin Drive System. Aeolia Schenberg is voiced by Chikao Ōtsuka (TV series) and Tsutomu Isobe (Movie) in Japanese and Michael Kopsa in English.

Wang Liu Mei (Chinese: 王留美; pinyin: Wáng Liúměi; Japanese: ワン・リューミン Wan Ryūmin)

A celebrity of Chinese descent, whose name is well known in the high society of the world, and is one of the secret agents of Celestial Being. She uses her wide social connections to conduct espionage activities and fundraising, passing mission details to the Gundam Meisters, supporting Ptolemaios from the shadows. She wishes for the world to change so she can reinvent herself, begrudging her role as her family's head, a position she inherited when she was fifteen. Willing to sacrifice anyone to achieve that goal, she would rather the world be destroyed if it cannot change. In the second season, Liu Mei is shown to be supporting both Celestial Being and the Innovators, effectively playing both sides until Ribbons has no more need of her. Forming an alliance with Regene, Liu Mei hands Setsuna the coordinates that reveal Veda's location, only to be later killed by Nena Trinity as she attempts to leave the battlefield. Wang Liu Mei is voiced by Kei Shindo in Japanese and Maryke Hendrikse in English.

Hong Long (Chinese: 紅龍; pinyin: Hóng Lóng; Japanese: ホンロン Hon Ron)

Wang Liu Mei's steward and bodyguard, also of Chinese descent, who accompanies her faithfully. A highly skilled martial artist, he is also Liu Mei's older half-brother. Because he was incapable of leading their family, Liu Mei was forced to take over. As a result, she resents her brother for his behavior. As one of Celestial Being's agents, Long assisted Setsuna and Lockon during their mission in Azadistan. In the second season, Long questions Liu Mei about "playing both sides", since it could result in the destruction of the Gundams. He and Liu Mei manage to survive after Nena Trinity's attacks on their ship in the Throne Drei. However, as they make their way into a satellite, Nena ambushes them, and Hong Long pushes his sister into a seal-docking port as he sacrifices himself to save her, killed with a shot to the head. Hong Long is voiced by Kenji Takahashi in Japanese and Samuel Vincent in English.

== Union ==
The World Economic Union (世界経済連合, Sekai Keizai Rengō; abbrev. Union (ユニオン, Yunion)), also referred to as the Union of Solar Energy and Free Nations (太陽エネルギーと自由国家連合軍, Taiyō Enerugī to Jiyū Kokka Rengōgun), is a supranational politico-economic community consisting of the Organization of American States, Australasia, and Japan. It controls the first-completed of the three orbital elevators, located in South America.

Graham Aker (グラハム・エーカー, Gurahamu Ēkā)
Graham Aker is an ace pilot in the Union and considers himself the archrival of Setsuna F. Seiei, though Setsuna rarely reciprocates. Prior to the series, he joined the military to live his dream of flying, and follows a strict code of honor. However, a freak accident resulting in the death of a superior officer and his sudden promotion made Graham a victim of rumors. When Celestial Being makes its appearance in the world, Graham is promoted to Captain of the Overflags. Though he originally had a fascination for the Gundams, the actions of Team Trinity causes Graham's feelings to morph into utter hatred. In the final moments of Operation Fallen Angels, Graham uses the GN Flag to attack Setsuna, exchanging blows and clashing ideals with him before the battle ends, with Graham receiving scars on the right side of his face. Four years later, Graham dons a mask to cover the scars and becomes a member of the newly formed A-Laws under the alias of Mr. Bushido (ミスター・ブシドー, Misutā Bushidō). Possessing a one-man army pass, Graham was given special permission to do as he wishes during battles, only to use this to avoid most conflict and only fight when Setsuna appears. Graham is the Union's ace pilot and follows a strict code of honor. With a skill unmatched by any Flag pilot, Graham is eager to find an opponent worthy to fight. When Gundam Exia first appeared in the AEU exhibition and destroyed their new unit, the Enact, he became interested in the Gundam's capabilities (as Billy Katagiri notes, he's "quite infatuated" with the Gundams). After losing to Setsuna, who spared him, Graham takes Setsuna's words to live to heart while he is contemplating seppuku. At the end of the series, he is standing behind the doors watching his friend Billy working. In the Gundam 00 Movie, he sacrifices himself to help Setsuna to get into the ELS core claiming that it is not dying but opening the road to the future after he snaps Setsuna back into reality as the Gundam Meister is confused about battling the ELS due to his Innovator instincts resonating with ELS conscience, claiming that Setsuna shouldn't hesitate an instead should battle for the future. Graham Aker is voiced by Yuichi Nakamura in Japanese and Paul Dobson in English.
Billy Katagiri (ビリー・カタギリ, Birī Katagiri)
Billy Katagiri is a mobile suit developer and friend of Union ace Graham Aker. After the appearance of Celestial Being, Billy, Graham and Professor Ralph Eifman, who had taught Billy in college, are transferred to the Anti-Gundam Investigative Task Force, later named "Overflags". Billy is a former classmate of Leesa Kujo (aka Sumeragi Lee Noriega) and inadvertently leaks information about "Project G" to her and Celestial Being. After the death of Professor Eifman and Howard Mason during an attack by Team Trinity, Billy uses one of the recently acquired GN Drives to upgrade Graham's Flag unit to the GN-Flag in order to fight the Gundams.
By the second season, Billy is taking care of a despondent Kujo, still unaware that she was a member of Celestial Being until Setsuna F. Seiei appears to retrieve her. Shocked by this revelation and feeling betrayed, Billy joins the A-Laws and becomes the head of mobile suit development. Once again teaming up with Graham Aker (now using the alias Mr. Bushido), Billy develops the Masurao and the upgraded Susanoo. Billy disappears after the collapse of the African orbital elevator, but reappears four months later to provide his Trans-Am findings to the Innovators as he personally confronts Kujo while claiming to embraced the Innovators' ideals of world peace. However when exposed to the 00 Raiser's Trans-Am Burst, Billy is forced to express his feeling to Kujo as she apologized for hurting him. At the end of the series, a picture of him and Kujo is shown on a desk while Billy himself smiles down at it, doing his work while his friend Graham stands beside him. In the movie, Billy seems to have started a relationship with Mina Carmine. Billy Katagiri is voiced by Yūji Ueda in Japanese and Kirby Morrow in English.
Howard Mason (ハワード・メイスン, Howādo Meisun)
A Union NCO with the rank of warrant officer. One of the first Flag Fighters assigned to the Anti-Gundam Investigative Task Force "Overflags" under Graham Aker. He seemed to have a friendship with Graham due to their belief in the qualities of the Flag. He has brown hair and glasses. He was killed in action by Michael Trinity. After his death, Graham and Daryl vowed to avenge his death. Howard Mason is voiced by Kenji Takahashi in Japanese and Trevor Devall in English.
Daryl Dodge (ダリル・ダッジ, Dariru Dajji)
A Union soldier with the rank of master sergeant. Another of the first Flag Fighters assigned to the Anti-Gundam Investigative Task Force "Overflags" under Graham Aker. Unlike Graham and Howard, he doesn't share their faith that a Flag can beat the Gundams. He is transferred to the Union's GN-X squad where he meets Patrick Colasour and tells him not to badmouth Graham. He is killed after performing a head-on suicide attack on Gundam Dynames in order to avenge Howard Mason's death. Daryl Dodge is voiced by Rintarou Nishi in Japanese and Scott McNeil in English.
Ralph Eifman (レイフ・エイフマン, Reifu Eifuman)
A world famous Union professor who is invited to join the Overflags as their technical chief. He taught both Sumeragi Lee Noriega and Billy Katagiri in college and knows them both well. When Graham asks him whether the Gundams' action may bring the war to an end, Eifman does not deny the fact. Professor Eifman joined the Union's Anti-Gundam Investigative Squad as their technical chief and adviser to aid in capturing the Gundams. Having Billy at his side, they custom modified Graham Aker's Flag and renamed it "Over Flag." Eventually these modifications were expanded to an entire squadron of Flags to stand against the Gundams. While doing his investigation regarding Celestial Being, Eifman was on the verge of a major revelation about their ultimate intention, but was killed by Team Trinity. Ralph Eifman is voiced by Takaya Hashi in Japanese and Ron Halder in English.
Kinue Crossroad (絹江・クロスロード, Kinue Kurosurōdo)
Saji's older sister. A journalist, she pursues Celestial Being during the course of working in the media. She and her brother Saji were orphaned prior to the start of the series. Kinue seemed obsessed over Aeolia Schenberg, believing that Celestial Being had motives other than ending warfare and that researching Schenberg is the key to discovering those motives. In episode 20, desperate for a lead, she interviews Ali Al-Saachez in his car. He gives her significantly more information than she expects, shocking Kinue before she is fatally wounded by Ali and left to die in an alleyway. Kinue Crossroad is voiced by Aya Endo in Japanese and Anna Cummer in English.

== Human Reform League ==
The Human Reform League (人類革新連盟, Jinrui Kakushin Renmei; abbrev. 人革連 Jinkakuren, lit. Human Reform Alliance) is a supranational political-economic community consisting of several countries on the Asian continent which includes China, India, Russia and the ASEAN nations. It controls the second-completed of the three orbital elevators located in the South Pacific.

Sergei Smirnov (セルゲイ・スミルノフ, Serugei Sumirunofu)
Sergei Smirnov (Russian: Сергей Смирнов) is a colonel and mobile suit squadron commander of the Human Reform League. He is a respected man who follows orders without question and shows true dedication on his missions in spite of doubt. He firmly believes that soldiers exist to protect the civilians at any cost. He served as a father figure to Soma when she was assigned to him, as he felt uneasy about letting such a young child grow up as a cold soldier, managing to form a bond with her, offering to adopt her in the four years gap between the first and second season. But when he finds Soma with Allelujah, and discovers that her original identity was overwritten, he lets her join Celestial Being and falsely reports Soma as KIA. He has a stranded relationship with his son, Andrei Smirnov, as Andrei blames him for letting his mother die under Sergei's charge. When he was forced to choose between protecting the civilians under his care or sending the troops to aid the stranded soldiers on the frontline, his wife among them. Choosing the former, he stated that his wife was a soldier and she knew the duty of both, which ended with his wife dying and her body never being found. Doubting the ways of the A-Laws, Sergei learns that his old friend Pang Hercury is attempting a coup d'etat. Though secretly sent by the government to give him their demands, Sergei is killed by his son, Andrei, who assumed that he was part of the coup. However, after the A-Laws were disbanded, Sergei became a martyr. Sergei Smirnov is voiced by Unshō Ishizuka in Japanese and Michael Dobson in English.
Soma Peries (ソーマ・ピーリス, Sōma Pīrisu)
Soma Peries is a super soldier from the Human Reform League. Originally named Marie Parfacy (マリー・パーファシー, Marī Pāfashī), she was an orphaned test subject who lost her physical senses due to psychosomatic paralysis. She was befriended by Allelujah before he and the other "flawed" subjects escaped. Once put through the latter stages of her supersoldier treatment, Marie's personality was rewritten into Soma Peries, which allowed her to regain the five senses she lost during the initial process to transform her into a super-soldier. In her first appearance, Soma pilots the MSJ-06 II-SP Tieren Taozi, and later a GNX-603T GN-X unit. During the first season, she targeted the Kyrios' pilot as a traitor, unaware he is Allelujah. While drafted into the A-Laws during season 2, Soma is given the customized GNX-704T/SP Ahead Smultron. However, after confronting Allelujah, Soma regains her original identity of Marie as they put the past behind them. Afterwards, Allelujah and Marie became lovers. As a member of Celestial Being, she initially serves only as a passenger, before eventually piloting the GNR-101A GN Archer as Allelujah's co-pilot. When Sergei is killed by Andrei, Marie's personality reverts to Soma out of grief, but she remains with Celestial Being in order to get revenge on Andrei. She eventually reverts to her Marie personality fully after she and Andrei are able to reconcile. In the series aftermath, she and Allelujah have apparently left Celestial Being and are finding their place in the world. In "Awakening of Trailblazer", she and Allelujah reenlist with Celestial Being and jointly pilot the Harute Gundam, which uses the Marute-System (a Super Soldier-only Trans-Am version) against the ELS invasion. It is revealed that both Allelujah and Marie can change willingly into their alter egos. Soma Peries is voiced by Arisa Ogasawara in Japanese and Tabitha St. Germain in English.

== Advanced European Union ==
The Advanced European Union (新ヨーロッパ共同体, Shin Yōroppa Kyōdō-tai), or AEU, is a supranational politico-economic community consisting of Iceland, the islands of the Barents Sea, Greenland, Anatolia, European Russia and the entirety of the traditional continent of Europe. Its institutional makeup is comparable to that of the real-world European Union. Despite the AEU's control of the presently incomplete orbital elevator tower in Africa, it possesses no member states on the continent.

Patrick Colasour (パトリック・コーラサワー, Patorikku Kōrasawā)
Patrick Colasour is an ace pilot of the AEU and the first to be confronted by a Gundam during a public demonstration of the AEU's new Enact mobile suit. He serves as the series' comic relief. Although the Enact was completely destroyed by Gundam Exia, Patrick survives with only his ego wounded. Patrick's subsequent encounters with the Gundams do not fare any better, although he manages to wound Gundam Dynames's pilot, Lockon Stratos, while Lockon shields a disabled Gundam Virtue, piloted by Tieria Erde, from Patrick's attack.
During the preparations for "Project G", a joint military operation between all 3 power blocs, Patrick meets Kati Mannequin for the first time and – after she punches him twice for being late – claims to have instantly fallen in love with her. In the second season, Patrick joins the A-Laws to be with Mannequin against her wishes. Because he has survived all his encounters with the Gundams, he gains the nickname "Colasour the Indestructible" (不死みのコーラサワ, Fujimi no Colasour; lit. "Immortal Colasour"), though it is meant as an insult. After the collapse of the African orbital elevator, Patrick goes missing along with Mannequin, but reappears four months later having joined the coup d'etat that attacks an A-Laws fleet near L_{2}. While aiding the Gundams, Patrick is caught off guard when the Innovators' Gaga units appear and his mobile suit is destroyed while shielding Mannequin's ship. He survives the blast and later marries his beloved Kati, self-proclaiming himself as "Colasour the Ridiculously Lucky" (幸せのコーラサワ, Shiawase no Colasour; lit.Fortunate Colasour). He appears in the Gundam 00 movie escorting his wife at all times and is present on the Absolut Defense Line in the battle against the ELS. While he is not as skilled as Graham Aker, the Innovades nor the Gundam Pilots, he is one of the few pilots that are not shot down when the ELS suddenly turns into mobile suits. Later his suit is trapped by the ELS, and he attempts to overload his suit to self destruct but is saved by Setsuna at the very last moment with the arrival of the 00 Qan[T]. Patrick Colasour is voiced by Kenji Hamada in Japanese and Trevor Devall in English.
Kati Mannequin (カティ・マネキン, Kati Manekin)
Kati Mannequin is a colonel in the unified AEU armed forces. She attended the same international university as Leesa Kujō and both were involved with unintentionally causing a friendly fire incident to occur that led to them being on opposing sides when Celestial Being appears. Selected to be the commanding officer of the AEU contingent sent to the HRL's Taklamakan Desert, Kati attempts to capture a Gundam unit. Kati is later assigned command of the joint Union-AEU battle group consisting of GN-Xs in conjunction with the HRL's Sergei Smirnov. Four years later, Kati Mannequin joins A-laws to help Sergei monitor the organization's activities; as a commander for the A-laws, she realizes that Leesa Kujō is the tactical forecaster for Celestial Being. Though she eventually goes against the A-Laws, Kati still sees Celestial Being as a terrorist group and will not hesitate to pursue if forced to. Her love interest is Patrick Colasour, whom she hits twice for being late during their first meeting. As the series goes on he makes advances on her, while her ego makes her pretend that she is annoyed with him, she is, in truth, delighted, as is stated when Patrick arrives to her home attempting to take her on a date, as while she initially berates him for being vain in the middle of a war, she ends up agreeing. Later in the second season, Patrick joins A-Laws against Kati's wishes just to be close to her, but in the end she seems amused by this. At the end of the series when she joins Katharon and Celestial Being in the final battle against the Innovators, she openly accepts her love for Patrick when he shields her ship with his own mobile suit against an unexpected Gaga suicide units' assault – she screams his name, distraught, as he is seemingly killed after proclaiming his love for her. Patrick survived, and in the epilogue they get married, saying that Patrick indeed is "Ridiculously Lucky." In "A Wakening of a Trailblazer" set two years after, she is promoted but Patrick still calls her "Colonel" as a petname, much to her annoyance. Kati Mannequin is voiced by Minami Takayama in Japanese and Cathy Weseluck in English.

== Katharon ==
Marina Ismail (マリナ・イスマイール, Marina Isumaīru)
Marina Ismail (Persian: مارینا اسماعیل; Azeri: Marina İsmayıl) is the First Princess of Azadistan, which is struggling economically due to the UN's embargo on oil exports. She is politically inexperienced and comes from an ordinary household, but accepted the position of Princess of Azadistan when Parliament chose her based on her lineage. She first encounters Setsuna F Seiei during her diplomatic mission to seek economic aid and access to the solar energy pipelines. After learning that Setsuna is one of Celestial Being's Gundam Meisters, she slowly develops a concern for his well-being. Conversely, Marina becomes an influencing figure in Setsuna's life; she appears in one of his dreams, telling him it is okay for him to stop fighting. At the very end of the first series, Marina reads a letter from Setsuna about his search for answers and that though the two follow separate paths, they share the same goal of ending war.
During the second series, Marina is arrested by the Federation because of her perceived connection with Setsuna. Setsuna rescues Marina during Celestial Being's operation to free Allelujah Haptism, and she is brought on board the Ptolemaios II. After witnessing Azadistan in flames because of an attack by Ali Al-Saachez, she is left in the care of her former adviser, Shirin Bakhtiar, who is now a member of the anti-government group Katharon. However, Marina refuses to fight. Instead, she tends to the children orphaned by the conflict and uses their wishes as the basis for a song which will be the main anthem of the people's longing for true peace. In the epilogue, she is seen leading a rebuilt Azadistan. In the Gundam 00 movie, she is seen telling the people of her realm not to panic about the ELS invasion. In the movie's epilogue, set 50 years after the ELS invasion, she is visited by Setsuna after he turned into an ELS being. Almost blind by then, she bursts into tears once she hears Setsuna's voice and they embrace. Marina Ismail is voiced by Ayumi Tsunematsu in Japanese and Paula Lindberg in English.
Shirin Bakhtiar (シーリン・バフティヤール, Shīrin Bafutiyāru)
In the first season, Shirin Bakhtiar (Persian: شیرین بختیار; Azeri: Şirin Bəxtiyar) serves as Marina Ismail's advisor and confidant. Shirin shows a great deal of political knowledge, however much of her advice tends to be biting. By the second season, Shirin has left Marina to join the anti-Federation group Katharon, where she is Klaus Grad's sub-commander. After Azadistan is attacked by Ali Al Saachez, Shirin comforts a grieving Marina. Shirin tells Marina the only way to rebuild Azadistan is to destroy the Federation and that it is her duty to fight as its princess. However, Marina says that she doesn't see how fighting will resolve anything, to which Shirin replies she doesn't mind if Marina chooses not to fight, but she vows to continue fighting for her homeland. In the epilogue, Shirin is seen as a politician for the new Earth Sphere Federation. Shirin Bakhtiar is voiced by Michiko Neya in Japanese and Ellen Kennedy in English.
Klaus Grad (クラウス・グラード, Kurausu Gurādo)
Appearing in the second series, Klaus Grad is a top commander of the anti-government organization Katharon, which opposes the Earth Sphere Federation and its elite squad A-Laws. When Katharon member Lyle Dylandy joins Celestial Being as the new Lockon Stratos, Klaus begins a regular correspondence with Lyle about Celestial Being's activities. After helping the crew of the Ptolemaios II escape from an A-Law ambush, Klaus proposes an allegiance, however the proposal is rejected by Sumeragi Lee Noriega and Setsuna F Seiei. Despite the rejection, Klaus continues to offer support to Celestial Being whenever possible. Four months after the collapse of the African orbital elevator, Katharon's Earth forces are nearly wiped out. Klaus decides to head to space, given hope by the global spread of the song written and sung by Marina Ismail and the children. In the epilogue, Klaus became a politician for the Earth Sphere Federation along with Shirin. In the Gundam 00 Movie epilogue set 50 years after the battle with ELS, Klaus is seem as the captain of the Deep Space Ship "Sumeragi" revealing that he turned into a true Innovator in the meantime. Klaus Grad is voiced by Tokuyoshi Kawashima in Japanese and Alistair Abell in English.

== Independent antagonists ==
Ali Al-Saachez (アリー・アル・サーシェス, Arī Aru Sāshesu)
Ali Al-Saachez (علي الساجيس Ali al-Sajis) is a major antagonist of the series, and the former cell leader of the KPSA terrorist group in which Setsuna was a member. Generally a sadistic sociopath, Ali merely fights to appease his insatiable appetite for conflict and destruction, adopting various aliases to work for any party that feeds his desire for more conflict. In spite of his brutish nature, Ali has proven himself to be an extremely skilled tactician with fighting abilities that border on being superhuman, and routinely fights the Gundams to a standstill before gaining his own advantage. Eventually, he manages to steal the Gundam Throne Zwei while killing two of the three Trinity Siblings. However the machine is soon destroyed after Ali's fight with Neil Dylandy. Barely surviving with most of his body damaged, Ali manages to recover and subsequently works for the Innovators, piloting the Throne Arche. He is killed by Lyle Dylandy in episode 24 of season 2 after Tiera activates the Trial Gundam and disables his Throne Arche. While his mobile suit is destroyed he survives and attempts to escape, however he is cornered by Lyle and held at gunpoint. As Lyle decides to lower his gun and let him leave, Ali tries to take advantage of the situation to kill Lyle, only to be killed in turn. Ali Al-Saachez is voiced by Keiji Fujiwara in Japanese and Scott McNeil in English.
Alejandro Corner (アレハンドロ・コーナー, Arehandoro Kōnā)
Alejandro Corner is the main antagonist of the series' first season. Originally an observer of Celestial Being assisted by Ribbons, supporting them from the shadows, Alejandro doubles as a diplomat of the United Nations. However, Alejandro and his family had ulterior motives in supporting Celestial Being in controlling the world they create. As a result, he committed sabotage against Celestial Being to gain control of Veda. But after Veda shuts its most precious data to him, Alejandro pilots the GNMA-XCVII Alvatore and then the GNMS-XCVII Alvaaron to eliminate Celestial Being. He is killed after his Alvaaron explodes during the battle with Exia, spending his final moments discovering that Ribbons had used him as a pawn the entire time. Alejandro Corner is voiced by Yasunori Matsumoto in Japanese and Andrew Kavadas in English.

== Gundam Throne Meisters/Team Trinity ==
Although Trinity's past and origins remain a mystery in the show itself, the official Mobile Suit Gundam 00 novels state that the three siblings were created by Ribbons Almark, who used parts of his own DNA to engineer human beings with several Innovator-like traits. As a result, they are able to perform otherwise impossible tasks such as interfacing with Veda and using quantum brainwaves. But unlike the Innovades, the Trinity siblings have significantly less androgynous appearances.

Johann Trinity (ヨハン・トリニティ, Yohan Toriniti)
Oldest of the three siblings, Johann pilots the Gundam Throne Eins. Undertaking the mission to eradicate the world's strife, he began armed interventions alongside Michael and Nena. He is a calm person who faithfully handles his given mission while he commands his problematic brother and sister. His rational and cool-headed demeanor provides a subtle contrast to his fiery and stubborn younger siblings. Also unlike his younger siblings, Johann does not take lives that are not involved in their mission. An excellent marksman, he handles the firing of the GN Mega Launcher equipped to the Gundam Throne Eins. Johann is killed by Ali Al-Saachez after Al-Saachez kills Michael and steals the Throne Zwei. Johann is voiced by Katsuyuki Konishi in Japanese and Michael Daingerfield in English.
Michael Trinity (ミハエル・トリニティ, Mihaeru Toriniti)
An impulsive young man, Michael immediately bares his fangs at people who oppose him, brandishing his trademark knife when feeling enraged or intimidated. He is also very rude to the Gundam Meisters upon their first meeting, although he does comment that Tieria Erde would be "kinda hot" if he were a girl. Similar to his personality, he favors brutal tactics for mobile suit combat and specializes in attacks with the Gundam Throne Zwei's all-range weapon, the GN Fangs. Though he feels somewhat protective over his younger sister, Nena, he frequently complains about having to comply with orders from his brother, Johann. Michael is killed by Ali Al-Saachez who then goes on to steal Michael's Throne Zwei. Michael is voiced by Daisuke Namikawa in Japanese and Andrew Toth in English.
Nena Trinity (ネーナ・トリニティ, Nēna Toriniti)
Nena Trinity is the youngest of the Trinity siblings and pilot of the Gundam Throne Drei. Nena presents herself as being a cheerful and flirtatious young girl, however she is selfish and callous in battle. Between two of Team Trinity's missions, Nena fires upon an unsuspecting wedding party, killing Louise Halevy's entire family, out of frustration that others are having fun while she is overworked. After witnessing the deaths of Johann and Michael at the hands of Ali Al-Saachez, Nena is saved by Setsuna's timely intervention, and leaves in her Gundam while mourning the loss of her brothers.
In the second series, intent on surviving, Nena works directly under Wang Liu Mei. Piloting the Riian, she is often sent out on stealth and reconnaissance missions to gather information on the activities of groups such as Katharon and the A-Laws. But because of Liu Mei's contacts with the Innovators and Ali Al-Saachez, Nena begins to question Liu Mei's motivations as she secretly helps the crew of the Ptolemaios II. She finally betrays Liu Mei by attacking her ship. Though Liu Mei and Hong Long survive the assault, Nena tracks them down and shoots Hong Long in the head and later kills Liu Mei as she tries to escape, revealing she always hated her. While she intended to eventually betray the Innovators and avenge her brothers when she got a chance, Ribbons Almark had already arranged for her to be dealt with by Louise in the Regnant immediately attacking her. After disabling the Throne Drei, Louise kills Nena without mercy to avenge her family. Nena is voiced by Rie Kugimiya in Japanese and Nicole Bouma in English.

== A-Laws ==
The Autonomous Peace-Keeping Force, or A-Laws (アロウズ, Arōzu), is the primary antagonistic organization of the second series. Officially, their mission is to further unify nations by rooting out anti-government resistance. But their ideals and tactics are a facade of brutal oppression. Their actions trigger the emergence of some anti-Federation forces, like Katharon and Celestial Being, which returns after four years. Many characters from the first series join the A-Laws, including Graham Aker (as Mr. Bushido), Billy Katagiri, Soma Peries, Patrick Colasour, Kati Mannequin and Louise Halevy.

Louise Halevy (ルイス・ハレヴィ, Ruisu Harevi)
In the first series, Louise Halevy is Saji Crossroad's girlfriend and classmate. Compared to the mild-mannered Saji, Louise is hyperactive, teasing, and clingy. She loves Saji dearly and often gets jealous of other girls spending any amount of time with him, including her own mother. She becomes an acquaintance of Setsuna F. Seiei when the latter becomes Saji's neighbour. While Louise is attending her cousin's wedding, Gundam Throne Meister Nena Trinity attacks the wedding party out of boredom, killing Louise's entire family in front of her eyes and causing Louise to lose her left hand, which is unable to be regenerated due to the red GN particles. After the attack, broken mentally, Louise breaks off her relationship with Saji so that he can be free to pursue his dream of working in space.
In the second series, after receiving an artificial limb, Louise becomes a member of the A-Laws after Regene Regetta escorts her from a hospital to meet with Ribbons Almark, who channels her intent for revenge and world peace and attempts to make her the first purebred Innovator with pills that enhance her physical capabilities despite the side-effect of causing slow bodily deterioration. She learns of Setsuna's connection with Celestial Being after meeting him at a party held by Ribbons. During the A-Laws' attack on Celestial Being's asteroid base, she discovers that Saji is helping Celestial Being and assumes that he has been with Celestial Being all along. Her hatred for Celestial Being grows, first after the reported death of Soma Peries and later when her commanding officer Barack Zinin is killed in action. After the collapse of the Africa tower, she learns that Andrei Smirnov killed his own father. Shocked by the revelation, she wonders if she could ever do the same to Saji. Louise almost crosses that barrier as she gains the mobile armor Regnant from Ribbons which she uses to kill Nena, falling under Ribbons's influence after her mental breakdown. During the final battle she clashes with him until she sees him wearing the engagement ring he gave her and she faints upon being overwhelmed by her memories of them together. Setsuna's Trans-Am burst wakes her up and apparently healed all the cell abnormalities, thus granting her a healthy body again. In the season's epilogue and in the movie, Louise is once again in a relationship with Saji, but is plagued by chronic PTSD. In the movie she seems to be turned into a quantum-brainwaves user, as she is one of the first persons to be affected by the ELS approach. She later encourages Saji's decision to travel to the orbital ring and help with its maintenance while the Earth forces battle the ELS invasion. Louise Halevy is voiced by Chiwa Saitō in Japanese and Kelly Sheridan in English.
Andrei Smirnov (アンドレイ・スミルノフ, Andorei Sumirunofu)
Andrei Smirnov is the estranged son of Sergei Smirnov and member of the A-Laws. Andrei holds a grudge against his father for not protecting his mother 14 years before the beginning of the second season, and joins the HRL military and later the A-Laws to forge his own path. Andrei meets Louise Halevy and becomes protective of her, as he sees her more as a young girl than a soldier. After the AEU's orbital elevator collapse as a result of a coup d'état by the Federation's military, Andrei kills his father in a fit of rage when Andrei assumes that Sergei sided with the coup's forces. After Setsuna defeated him easily, he eventually comes to terms with his father's actions after his consciousness connects with the consciousness of Soma at the climax of the final battle, noting that both Sergei and Andrei failed at trying to understand each other, as his father didn't know how to reach him and Andrei failing to understand how he father felt. This is also when Soma finally goes into a dormant state as she finally come to terms with the Colonel's death, allowing Marie to regain full control as she finally feels the despair and grief that Andrei feels for his actions. In the epilogue, he continues to serve in the Federation army in relief efforts in order to live up to his mother and father's hopes and ideals of being a "Soldier that protects the civilians" for the world. In the Gundam 00 Movie, Andrei battled against the ELS with his mobile suit after the ELS threatened the well-being of mankind. In the final battle, he fights valiantly against an ELS GNX-IV and defeats the enemy, but the right arm of his GNX-IV is assimilated along with his beam rifle. He uses his GN Buster Sword to cut off the arm, and discovers an ELS carrier heading towards Earth. Activating the Trans-Am, he slices the carrier a few times before a part of his suit is assimilated. He, along with a few of his comrades in GNX-IVs, then proceed to overload their GN Drive Taus with Trans-Am, and destroy the ELS carrier along with themselves and their mobile suits. Before his death, he sees his parents, and yells "I am a soldier that protects the civilians!" Andrei Smirnov is voiced by Tetsu Shiratori in Japanese and Brent Miller in English.
Barack Zinin (バラック・ジニン, Barakku Jinin)
A former member of the Union army and captain of his own platoon, Barack pilots the newly developed GNX-704T Ahead and is responsible for the extermination of anti-government forces, mostly Katharon. His wife was killed shortly before the commencement of the second season after being involved in one of Katharon's anti-Federation terrorist attacks. Initially looking down on Louise Halevy, Barack often shows a great concern for her due to her young age, often chastising her for her reckless behaviour on the battlefield. He is eventually killed by Setsuna after the 00 Gundam docks with the 0-Raiser, and is later promoted posthumously to lieutenant colonel. His passing causes a significant amount of grief in Louise. Barack Zinin is voiced by Tetsu Inada in Japanese and Mark Gibbon in English.
Arthur Goodman (アーサー・グッドマン, Āsā Guddoman)
A man who holds a high position within the A-Laws. He initially appears in the epilogue of the first season, next to Kati Mannequin in the Federation lineup, but is not introduced proper until the second season. He overlooks the A-Laws' operation against Katharon, and is highly interested in Barrack's and Louise's encounter with Gundams Exia and Seravee, stating that "more equipment" is required. He is later seen in a conversation with Kati Manneqin and Arba Lindt. After Lindt's defeat by Celestial Being, Arthur orders that command be given back to Kati, telling them that failure is unacceptable in A-Laws. He is one of the A-Laws officers present at the A-Laws party. He is later seen leading the operations to obliterate the Suille Kingdom, destroy the Africa Tower along with the coup d'etat forces, and attack Celestial Being using the Memento Mori weapons. He is also seen at the speech of the ESF President, and later after the operation in episode 19 to wipe out the Gundams and the Ptolemaios II, mocking Hiling Care for her failure to carry out the operation, and also decrying the decision to give her and Revive licenses. His assault, however, fails due to an uprising led by Kati aiding Celestial Being and Katharon, with Setsuna killing Goodman. Arthur Goodman is voiced by Hisao Egawa in Japanese and Jason Simpson in English.
Homer Katagiri (ホーマー・カタギリ, Hōmā Katagiri)
The uncle of Union member Billy Katagiri. He is the commander of the A-Laws. He also has a secret connection with the Innovators. When his nephew, Billy, is recruited into the A-Laws, he installs him as an MS Technical Chief and tells him that he has high hopes for him. When the 00 Gundam destroys the ship led by Lee Zhejiang to stop the Ptolemaios II from escaping to space, Commander Katagiri reluctantly decides to accept the aid of the Innovators in order to defeat Celestial Being and prevent further sacrifices. The Innovators soon deployed in the A-Laws as licensed officers, with new, powerful suits to combat the Gundams.
After the Ptolemaios II destroys the superweapon Memento Mori, the Federation government grants the A-Laws direct control of the military to further increase security. However, Homer fears that public support will eventually go to the anti-government force, Katharon, and tasks Brigadier General Arthur Goodman to handle Celestial Being. His fears were later realized when a number of dissidents in the regular army, led by Colonel Pang Hercury, occupied the AEU's orbital elevator. Worried that Katharon activities will increase, Homer orders Commander Kim in the regular army to send Sergei Smirnov on a top secret mission to ask the dissidents to surrender. When negotiations fail, Commander Katagiri sends Goodman into space to use another Memento Mori to completely destroy the elevator. At the end of the season, failing to defeat Celestial Being, and after news of the A-Laws disbanding was broadcast, Homer commits seppuku rather than facing charges. Albeit ruthless in his ways, he, in truth, seeks to achieve world peace. However, he was delusional, attempting to charge himself with all the sins and sacrifices intended to achieve that goal. This is thwarted in the end when Ribbons Almark, A-Laws and the Innovators are defeated in the last battle. Homer Katagiri is voiced by Ryūzaburō Ōtomo in Japanese and Brian Drummond in English.
Arba Lindt (アーバ・リント, Āba Rinto)
A man with a slightly wrinkled face and a head of grey hair, he is shown to be arrogant and overconfident in his abilities. Kati Mannequin recognizes that he is known for search and destroy operations. He commands the attack on the Celestial Being flagship, Ptolemaios II, but his strategy was thwarted by Celestial Being's tactical forecaster, Sumeragi Lee Noriega. He and his crew would have been killed by the 00 Gundam, if not for the timely arrival of Mr. Bushido. After his defeat and the loss of Trilobite, he is forced to give command to Kati. When the A-Laws headquarters decide to attack the Katharon base with the automatons, he simply tells Kati that there is no need to feel sympathy for them. After Soma is declared KIA, he gives the Ahead Smultron to Louise Halevy. During the strategy planning, he prepares a squad to follow his plan, but Kati changes part of it. He is among the A-Laws members who lead the Memento Mori operation. Lindt is killed after the ship under his command is caught in the explosion of Momento Mori station One. Arba Lindt is voiced by Kazuki Yao in Japanese and Andrew Toth in English.

== Innovators ==
The Innovators (Innovades) as they appear in season 2. From left to right: Regene Regetta, Hiling Care, Ribbons Almark, Divine Nova, Bring Stabity, and Revive Revival

At the start of Celestial Being's armed intervention, Ribbons Almark, from behind the scenes, leads a group consisting of six individuals known as Innovades (イノベイド, Inobeido), beings created by Aeolia Schenberg to pose as Innovators (イノベイター, Inobeitā). Supposedly essential to Aeolia's plan, Ribbons claims that they are "the future of mankind" while they are actually impressions of the true Innovators that would manifest within humans. Considered to be existences that surpass normal humans, they are beings created through means of heavy gene manipulation and nanotechnology. They are characterized by their advanced ability to use quantum brainwaves and directly interface with Veda, as well as their agelessness and androgyny. Tieria Erde is also an Innovade, but has sided with Celestial Being, and a number of other Innovades were shown participating in ordinary life worldwide in the final episode of season 2.

Ribbons Almark (リボンズ・アルマーク, Ribonzu Arumāku)
Ribbons Almark is the main antagonist of the series, acting through Alejandro Corner in the first season before abandoning him. Believing himself to be godlike, Ribbons' main goal throughout the series has been to twist Aeolia's plan to suit his own agenda of ruling humanity. He's extremely arrogant, and considers himself superior to both humans and Innovators, considering the former as insects and incapable of creating a better world. Using the A-Laws from behind the scenes, Ribbons watches the battles unfold from the comfort of his lair. The novels and Season 2 revealed that Ribbons is the pilot of 0 Gundam. During an intervention mission in the Kurdish Republic, he was supposed to kill all the combatants there. However, upon seeing the awed young Suran Ibrahim, Ribbons perceives the boy's look to be one of utter admiration and worship, and lets him live. Afterwards, he went and tampered with Veda's files to make Suran into Setsuna. He would later comment that this was a "momentary impulse...but also a sort of mercy." During a face-to-face meeting with Setsuna, Ribbons reveals his part in his entry into Celestial Being by tampering with Veda's files while attempting to take the 00 Raiser from him. After having Regene killed, Ribbons then proceeds to begin the final phase of his plan. However, after killing Tieria, Ribbons learns too late that Tieria merged his mind with Veda, and as a result loses control of Veda. Refusing to let his plan die, Ribbons reveals himself in the Reborns Gundam to fight Setsuna's 00 Gundam before taking one of its GN drives to re-power his 0 Gundam to battle Setsuna in the rebuilt Exia R2 in a heated battle until the 0 Gundam is destroyed. Ribbons Almark is voiced by Tōru Furuya (using a pseudonym Noboru Sōgetsu) in Japanese and Michael Adamthwaite in English.
Regene Regetta (リジェネ・レジェッタ, Rijene Rejetta)
Regene Regetta is an Innovator who is the genetic twin of Tieria Erde. Although he works closely with Ribbons Almark, the two do not always see eye to eye (in part because of Ribbons' ego). As a result, Regene often acts of his own will to complete the plan Aeolia intended, from meeting with Tieria to leaking Veda's location to Wang Liu Mei. However, Ribbons was a step ahead of Regene and had Ali Al-Saachez kill him when he attempted to kill Ribbons. However, Regene's consciousness lived long enough to see Tieria use the codes he gave him in their meeting to lock Ribbons out of Veda. Regene Regetta is voiced by Romi Paku in Japanese and Nicole Oliver in English.
Revive Revival (リヴァイブ・リバイバル, Rivaibu Ribaibaru)
Revive Revival is an Innovator and the genetic twin of Anew Returner. Revive joins the A-Laws to combat the Gundams and pilots the Gadessa. Like Mr. Bushido, Revive holds a special license that allows him to act independently, however he agrees to follow Kati Mannequin's battle strategies. Later Revive allows himself to be captured by Celestial Being in order to steal the 00 Gundam and 0 Raiser with Anew's aid, but the attempt is thwarted. Revive is killed by Lyle Dylandy during the climactic battle at the end of the second series when the Cherudim Gundam targets the Gadessa's cockpit after Lockon used the last remaining second of Cherudim's Trans-Am to move behind Gadessa. Revive Revival is voiced by Mitsuki Saiga in Japanese and Cathy Weseluck in English.
Hiling Care (ヒリング・ケア, Hiringu Kea)
Hiling Care is an Innovator and the genetic twin of Ribbons Almark, expressing a fondness for him and bearing a grudge against anyone else he has a fancy for. Hiling also frequently teases her comrades. Joining Revive Revival with the A-Laws, also with a special license that allows her to act independently, Hiling is eager to battle with Celestial Being and the Gundams. Hiling pilots a Gadessa and later a Garazzo in several operations against the Ptolemaios II. She is later ordered by Ribbons to retreat from A-Laws to help in defending Veda. In the final battle, she is brutally killed by the returned Hallelujah/Allelujah super-soldier, crying out to Ribbons to save her as she dies, while the reborn "True Super-Soldier" muses that the Innovators are unworthy and weak opponents when their support link with Veda is cut off. Hiling Care is voiced by Miyuki Kawashō in Japanese and Brenna O'Brien in English.
Bring Stabity (ブリング・スタビティ, Buringu Sutabiti)
Bring Stabity is an Innovator who is assigned to the A-Laws in order to combat the Gundams, considerably more stoic than his fellow Innovators. While Bring is able to overpower the 00 Gundam with the Garazzo in a display of force, he is later defeated during the A-Laws' assault on Celestial Beings's L3 base when the 00 Raiser is formed during the battle. Later, he and Revive are given orders to destroy the 00 Gundam. Bring is killed when he joins the attacking of the Ptolemaios II on Earth, fighting Tieria Erde whom he attempts to reason with, arguing that Tieria should join the other Innovators because he was one of them, to which Tieria replies by saying he isn't and that he is human, before his opponent reveals the Seraphim Gundam for the first time. Four months later, Ribbons reveals the creation of a massive army of Divine and Bring clones. Bring Stabity is voiced by Ryōtarō Okiayu in Japanese and Brian Dobson in English.
Divine Nova (デヴァイン・ノヴァ, Divain Nova)
Divine Nova is Bring Stabity's genetic twin and makes his first appearance piloting the prototype mobile armor Empress after Celestial Being successfully destroys Memento Mori. After forcing the Ptolemaios II back into Earth's atmosphere, he later takes part in an assault on the ship, which nearly succeeds until a coup d'état forces the A-Laws to withdraw. Divine is killed by Setsuna F. Seiei in the 00 Raiser while defending the second Memento Mori station. Four months later, Ribbons reveals the creation of a massive army of Divine and Bring clones. Divine Nova is voiced by Ryōtarō Okiayu in Japanese and Brian Dobson in English.
Anew Returner (アニュー・リターナー, Anyū Ritānā)
Anew Returner is Revive's genetic twin who serves her group as a sleeper agent in the guise of a mechanic who Liu Mei scouted after the activation of the 00 Gundam, and assisting with the development of the 0 Raiser and GN Archer support vehicles. When the Ptolemaios II arrives at Celestial Being's L3 base, on Ian's suggestion she joins the crew as a pilot and resident medic. Over time, Anew develops a romantic relationship with Gundam Meister Lyle Dylandy. Since joining the Ptolemaios II crew, Anew unknowingly served as a means for the Innovators to locate Celestial Being everywhere they go. It was only when Revive is captured that Anew's memories are restored, betraying Celestial Being and disabling the Ptolemaios II. However her attempt to steal the 00 Gundam is thwarted and she escapes along with Revive. Anew participates in the next operation to capture the 00 Gundam and confronts Lyle during the battle. When Lyle convinces Anew to return to him and Anew is about to, Ribbons takes control of her and she is subsequently shot down by Setsuna when she is about to kill Lyle. The 00 Raiser's Trans-Am allows the two to share a brief moment together, confirming their feelings for each other before her death. Despite her death, she briefly reappears in episode 25 during the inauguration of the new president of the Earth Sphere Federation, but as she is an Innovade it is most likely that the "Anew" present at that moment is nothing more than a genetic twin. Anew Returner is voiced by Ryoko Shiraishi in Japanese and Lalainia Lindbjerg in English.

== Movie-exclusive characters ==
Descartes Shaman (デカルト・シャーマン, Dekarute Shāman)
A Mobile Suit Squad Captain and the pilot of the GNMA-Y0002V Gadelaza, Descartes was a former member of the AEU before transferring into ESF Forces, and is the second human to have become a true Innovator. After his transformation, Descartes has fully embraced being an Innovator and shows his superiority towards other people in combat, although he has shown to be an arrogant and egotistical person. His quantum brainwaves enhance his natural piloting abilities, allowing him to maximize the performance of his mobile unit. He is also capable of fighting huge numbers of enemies using the Gadelaza's built-in weaponry, along with controlling a massive number of GN Fangs, hinting that his capabilities are quite extraordinary. Similar to Setsuna F. Seiei, Descartes' Innovator abilities have yet to be fully defined, and most of his abilities are merely based on observation and speculation.
Despite being officially acknowledged by the Earth Sphere Federation, Descartes is being used to find other people with similar abilities. In the Gundam 00 movie, once the activities of the ELS are realized, Descartes begins developing headaches. The ESF soon notice an entire ELS armada emerging from Jupiter's red spot, set to arrive at Earth within 95 days. Descartes sorties against the enemy in an attempt to figure out their intentions and attempt to lure them away from Earth with his QBWs. However, when he deploys his Fangs, some are assimilated, and he feels the same mental assault suffered by Setsuna. His Gadelaza is assimilated by a gigantic ELS, and Descartes is killed in the process. Descartes Shaman is voiced by Ryo Katsuji in Japanese and Ryan Luhning in English.
Mina Carmine (ミーナ・カーマイン, Mīna Kāmain)
An astrophysicist who works for the ESF, Mina Carmine helps to solve the mysteries of and investigate the ELS. It is also hinted that she has a relationship with Billy Katagiri. At one point in time, an ancestor of Mina donated a DNA sample to the Corner family, which was later used by Alejandro to create the Trinity Siblings. While the Trinity siblings are a result of a combination of this DNA sample and genetic material from Ribbons, Mina herself is a natural born human. Having proven herself to be highly intelligent, Mina's similar appearance to Nena Trinity, as well as her impulsive and playful personality, are coincidental developments. While she does indeed show a jealous streak, it is never shown if she is capable of such callous acts that the Gundam Meister was. Mina Carmine is voiced by Rie Kugimiya in Japanese and Nicole Bouma in English.
ELS
An unknown alien race, the ELS (Extraterrestrial Living-metal Shape-shifter) is a race of techno-organic sentient aliens that have the unique abilities to infect and assimilate nearly all life and technology. It is revealed their homeworld was destroyed by the Red Dwarf Star and they set off to find another world to live on. The ELS appear as silver metallic organisms that can take solid or liquid-like forms. The ELS have no true form as they are capable of taking any shape or size relative to their mass. They can combine or separate from one another to increase or decrease mass as needed. While not an aggressive race, their ways of learning and understanding their environment is based on assimilation of all things – being one with what they don't know allows them to understand. When faced with an opponent or something they cannot comprehend, assimilation occurs to convert the target of interest into an ELS. When confronted with unknown organic lifeforms and/or technologies, the ELS assimilates the target like an aggressive virus. Its rapid adaptability and versatility allow it to take hold of technology in a matter of seconds and organic matter in a matter of minutes. However, for organics, it can have detrimental effects to those not completely assimilated, such as causing brain damage and various biological instabilities due to the invasive nature to their condition. While their complete nature is not understood, they can generate a noise signal for communication. Initially their basic original physical form before assimilation is a missile like shape. They utilize quantum brainwave frequencies, make copies of what they have assimilated and have their own GN-Tech and unique GN Particles, which are purple in colour. However, it is not clear whether it is due to their own development and evolution or from copying Celestial Being's technology. In the epilogue, the ELS coexist with humanity.

== Other media ==
=== Mobile Suit Gundam 00P ===
Ruido Resonance (ルイード・レゾナンス, Ruīdo Rezonansu)
Ruido Resonance is one of the four Gundam Meisters employed by Celestial Being in the period in which 00P is set. Designated pilot of the Gundam Astraea at Krung Thep. A skilled mechanic, and a senior officer to Chall Acustica as of her inception as Meister. He later married Marlene Vlady and is the father of Feldt Grace. He and Marlene were killed in an accident involving Gundam Plutone, an incident which also caused Chall to be permanently scarred.
Marlene Vlady (マレーネ・バラディ, Marēne Baradi)
Marlene Vlady is one of the four Gundam Meisters employed by Celestial Being in the period in which 00P is set. A criminal forced by Celestial Being to serve as a Meister of a prototype Gundam unit at Krung Thep. As she does not support the organization's ideology, a remotely detonatable explosive has been strapped around her neck to keep her under control. Extremely skilled at piloting. Partner to Chall Acustica as of her inception as Meister. She is the mother of Feldt Grace.
Chall Acustica (シャル・アクスティカ, Sharu Akusutika)
Chall Acustica is one of the four Gundam Meisters employed by Celestial Being in the period in which 00P is set. A member of Celestial Being and the designated Meister of a prototype Gundam unit. Selected for recruitment by Veda on the basis of her academic performance and her ranking in Power Loader competitions. Ruido Resonance believes that other qualities may have influenced Veda's arbitration. In Mobile Suit Gundam 00F, she is the commanding officer of Fereshte, having ceased active service as a Meister after an incident that scarred her face and prematurely whitened her hair. Following the completion of the Gundams, she obtained permission from Veda to set up the branch of Celestial Being known as Fereshte. She is stated to have some past relationship with the Gundam Plutone.
Gundam Meister 874 (ウマイスター874, Umaisutā 874)
Gundam Meister 874 is one of the four Gundam Meisters employed by Celestial Being in the period in which 00P is set. Designated pilot of the Gundam Sadalsuud. Though Meisters are typically referred to by codename, 874 is designated only by number. For unspecified reasons, she does not appear before the other members of the organization. Physically, she looks younger than 10, but her eyes seem far older.
Grave Violento (グラーベ・ヴィオレント, Gurābe Viorento)
Grave Violento is a third generation meister and agent for Celestial Being. He is eventually revealed to be a combat type Innovade. Meister of GN-XXX Gundam Rasiel. Despite his designation as a meister, Grave spends more time acting as an agent to acquire information on military operations in preparation for Celestial Being's debut and protecting the organization by manipulating intelligence to ensure Celestial Being remains a secret as it begins its armed interventions. Because of his role as an agent, he is also responsible for locating potential Gundam Meisters for the fourth generation Gundams. Grave personally recruits Neil Dylandy and Allelujah Haptism as Meisters. Despite diligently following the orders of Veda, Grave gradually becomes suspicious of Veda's directives and eventually opposes and chooses not to complete them.
Hixar Fermi (ヒクサー・フェルミ, Hikusā Ferumi)
Hixar Fermi is the pilot of GN Sefer. His jovial personality allows him to talk freely with almost anyone, even when meeting them for the first time. Hixar enjoys making others laugh, though has considerable trouble doing so with the serious Grave and dark-mannered Chall. Several years later, he appears in 00F as a Gundam Meister on orders from Veda to follow Fon Spaak, who has been working independently from Fereshte. While Hixar appears to be the same man from 00P, his personality is markedly different and he is shown to have a remotely detonatable explosive strapped around his neck. Hixar is eventually revealed to be an intelligence-gathering Innovade, recalled to Veda after his supposed death, for a new mission. His loyalties, and that of Hayana, eventually shift away from Veda to Celestial Being.
Delphine Bedelia (デルフィーヌ・ベデリア, Derufīnu Bederia)
Highly skilled and proud, Delphine Bedelia is a test pilot from the Next Generation Development Technical Laboratory of the Human Reform League, and serves as the Tieren Kyitwo mobile suit's rear seat pilot. Though she initially dislikes being partnered with Leonard and regards him with little respect, Delphine ends up wanting to protect him. After she and Leonard become eyewitnesses of the Gundams, they are designated by Veda as the second of the primary targets to be eliminated when Grave is assigned to eliminate those aware of Celestial Being's existence. After they are spared, they choose to join Celestial Being in order to find Allelujah, whom they have come to regard as a comrade. In Gundam 00I 2314, Delphine joins the reorganized Fereshte under the code name Dell Erda (デル・エルダ, Deru Eruda) and participates in the development and retrieval of the GN Drives at Jupiter with Hayana.
Leonard Fiennes (レナード・ファインズ, Renādo Fainzu)
The front seat pilot of the Tieren Kyitwo sent from the Super Soldier Special Duty Organization to become a test pilot, despite only being seven years old and lacking any apparent ability as a supersoldier, save a susceptibility to the emission of quantum brainwaves from other supersoldiers. Unemotional and rarely anxious, he is kindhearted and comes to regard Delphine as an important person who must be protected. When Grave is assigned to eliminate eyewitnesses to the Gundams and those aware of Celestial Being's existence, Leonard and Delphine are second among the designated targets. When Grave spares them, they elect to find Allelujah, whom they have come to regard as a comrade, and join Celestial Being. In Gundam 00I 2314, Leonard has been designated as a Gundam Meister for Fereshte under the code name Leo Sieg (レオ・ジーク, Reo Jiiku) and charged with protecting Delphine and Hayana as they retrieve the GN Drives from Jupiter.

=== Mobile Suit Gundam 00F ===
Fon Spaak (フォン・スパーク, Fon Spāku)
A protagonist in the sidestory Mobile Suit Gundam 00F. A criminal forced by Celestial Being to serve as a Gundam Meister at Fereshte. As he does not support the organization's ideology, a remotely detonatable explosive has been strapped about his neck to keep him under control. Normally handcuffed, except when piloting. In Gundam 00F Chapter 03, Fon Spaak seems to recognize Ali when pursuing him with his Albuhool Type F, dismissing Ali as a relic of the past Solar Wars. In Gundam 00F Chapter 04, the remotely detonatable bomb which causes blood to ooze out is activated by Trinity when Fon attempted to stop them from taking away 0 Gundam and its GN Drive.
Fon's true name is Robert Stad Jr, as revealed by Nena Trinity in Gundam 00F Chapter 05. His parents were involved in mining materials for colony construction, and the harsh environment led him to become an anti-Union terrorist. In a later chapter of the Gundam 00F manga, Fereshte sends Fon to recover the GN Drives from the Kyrios and Virtue after Celestial Being's battle with the UN Army. Though Fon retrieves the Kyrios' ejected GN Drive, he allows Allelujah to be captured rather than rescue him, and leaves Tieria in the wreckage of the Virtue after finding that its GN Drive has been ejected as well, despite Meister 874's request to rescue Tieria.
In addition to appearing in Gundam 00F, Fon appears in Gundam 00P, encountering Grave Violento when Fon was a soldier for the AEU during the Solar Wars. During this time, he was already known as "Fon Spaak". It is also revealed that he was involved with Ali Al-Saachez as a child soldier, much like Setsuna F. Seiei. When Grave is assigned to eliminate eyewitnesses to the Gundams and those who have become aware of Celestial Being's existence, Fon is the first target named by Veda.
Eco Calore (エコ・カローレ, Eko Karōre)
He was once a candidate Gundam Meister, but because he is inferior to Setsuna and the current Meisters, he was removed from consideration, and is now a pilot for Fereshte. He's a strong believer of Aeolia Schenberg's words of eliminating wars all over the Earth. Eco does not get along with Fon, believing that Fon is unsuited to be a member of Celestial Being because of his status as a criminal. He is usually the comic relief in 00F, having a tendency to overreact when Fon either points out something (usually obvious) to him or annoys him with his devil-may-care disposition.
Sherilyn Hyde (シェリリン・ハイド, Sheririn Haido)
A disciple of CB mechanic Ian Vashti. Has a good mechanic sense and maintains the modified prototype Gundams used by Fereshte. Though she is unemotional and seldom speaks, she does have another side to her and considers herself to be quite feminine. Good friends with and is frequently seen with Hanayo. Following the dissolution of Fereshte, Sherilyn devotes herself to helping develop the GN Condenser to match the levels of output achieved by the GN Drives.
Hanayo (ハナヨ)
A manmade AI that is of the same model as Lockon's Haro. Its ear-like flaps gives it a cat-like look. Partners with Fon in missions and provides support for him in the MS. It also acts as a supervisor and unlocks Fon's handcuffs on missions, most likely locking them back after missions are complete. Hanayo is able to set up a datalink with Lockon's Haro through Veda. It is confirmed that Meister 874 is inside Hanayo. As shown in Gundam 00F file No.05, Hanayo/Meister 874 can take control over Gundam Plutone.
Hayana (ハヤナ)
A girl who obeys Hixar Fermi, Hayana possesses high physical capabilities most would not imagine from her appearance. Registered as a Gundam Meister in Veda, she is capable of taking control of a Gundam remotely. Hayana is considered Hanayo's "sister" and resembles her, but views Hanayo with hatred and attempts to eliminate her by destroying Hanayo's terminal.

=== Mobile Suit Gundam 00V ===
Robert Spacey (ロベール・スペイシー, Robēru Supeishī)
He was initially studying political history, but after experiencing the revolution brought about by Celestial Being when he was 30 years old and coincidentally seeing the Avalanche Exia in action, he switched his study to MS development history. An original character for sidestory, Mobile Suit Gundam 00V. Apart from that, he was also able to see the Dynames Torpedo and Shell Flag in action.
Deborah Galiena (デボラ・ガリエナ, Debora Gariena)
A female test pilot and inspector for the UN. She is also an old acquaintance of Robert Spacey. She was engaged by the Gundam Exia in an American military base on Okinawa when she was inspecting the Shell Flag's features. She proved herself to be a great pilot as she was able to survive the battle uninjured.
Amy Zimbalist (エイミー・ジンバリスト, Eimī Jinbarisuto)
An ace pilot of the Earth Sphere Federation Army with an unconventional style of piloting solar furnace equipped mobile suits. He is worshipped as a hero known as the "Steel Cowboy", but also hated as the "Devil of Unification". Despite being well-regarded, his piloting ability cannot measure up to the Gundam Meisters and he has poor analytical skills.

=== Mobile Suit Gundam 00I ===
Leif Recitativo (レイヴ・レチタティーヴォ, Reivu Rechitatiivo)
An Innovade with the same pattern as Ribbons Almark: type 0026. He is physically 18 years old. As an Innovade, Leif has the ability to distinguish humans from Innovades, and he has been charged with finding and educating other qualified Innovades.
Telicyra Herfi (テリシラ・へルフィ, Terishira Herufi)
An Innovade who has been working as a doctor and was previously affiliated with Doctors without Borders. Though he is 40 years old, his nature as an Innovade prevents him from aging like humans and he physically appears to be only 20 years old. He has lived in human society for over twenty years, despite Veda's average limit of 10 years before recalling Innovades to have their memories wiped and replaced, likely because of his renown as a doctor. Dr. Telicyra is responsible for awakening Leif as an Innovade.
Lars Grise (ラーズ・グリース, Rāzu Gurīsu)
An enigmatic Innovade who has lived in human society for over 130 years as a result of his information link to Veda being severed, though he is still monitored. At one point, he married and raised a family. Over the past 100 years he has killed other Innovades for reasons unknown, but appears to suffer emotionally when he kills. Since many of his victims have the same outward appearance, Veda intervened to hide his mass murders and Lars has never been caught. His left eye is artificial.
Bryn Sondheim (ブリュン・ソンドハイム, Buryun Sondohaimu)
An eight-year-old Innovade who is dressed like a young girl, despite identifying as a male. Bryn appears to only be able to communicate through his powerful quantum brain waves. When he is captured and imprisoned in the same Earth Federation facility as Allelujah Haptism, he is able to "speak" to Hallelujah through their quantum brain waves. During his imprisonment, Bryn's blood is drained by Dr. Clay Lihichyte, the doctor who created the Trinity siblings, and he is rendered physically immobile as a result.
Sulu Suluzu (スルー・スルーズ, Surū Surūzu)
An Innovade with the same base sequence as Telicyra, but her sex has been set as female. As an Innovade, she is capable of awakening other Innovades. She is currently acting as a member of Katharon alongside Hermiya. Both she and Telicyra apparently want to conceal they are Innovades of the same type, though they eventually refer to each other as brother and sister.
Hermiya (ハーミヤ, Hāmiya)
An Innovade who presumably has the same base sequence as Hanayo/Gundam Meister 874 and Hayana, since her appearance to them is very similar. Unlike Hanayo and Hayana, she appears cheerful and has been seen at a Katharon base. She has the ability to erase and reset Innovades. Like her comrades, she has been tasked by Veda to be an observer to perfect Aeolia Schenberg's plan.
Beside Pain (ビサイド・ペイン, Bisaido Pain)
An Innovade with the same base pattern as Ribbons Almark, the pilot of the 1 Gundam and a rogue agent of Celestial Being with access to Veda. Like Ribbons, he can transfer himself into another body if his current one is destroyed, though his transfers take more time. In Gundam 00P, Beside uses the ability to transfer his mind to take control of Hixar Fermi and attack Grave Violento. However, when Grave defeats Beside, he is unable to initiate a complete transfer into a new body. The partial transfer results in the awakening of Leif Recitativo. Because of their shared consciousness, Beside haunts and tries to take control of Leif in order to further his own goals until Telicyra is able to wipe Beside from Leif's mind.
