= Takayama tuberculata =

Scientific classification
- Domain: Eukaryota
- Clade: Diaphoretickes
- Clade: SAR
- Clade: Alveolata
- Phylum: Myzozoa
- Superclass: Dinoflagellata
- Class: Dinophyceae
- Order: Gymnodiniales
- Family: Kareniaceae
- Genus: Takayama
- Species: T. tuberculata

Binomial name
- Takayama tuberculata de Salas, 2008

Species of dinoflagellate

Takayama tuberculata is a species of unarmored dinoflagellate from the genus Takayama, being closely related to T. tasmanica. It was first isolated from the Australian region of the Southern Ocean, just north of the polar front. It is medium-sized and is characterized by its long ovoid cell shape and rather long apical groove. It is considered potentially ichthyotoxic.
