= Takiyama =

Takiyama may refer to:

- Takiyama Station, a railway station in Kawanishi, Hyōgo Prefecture, Japan
- Takiyama Prefectural Natural Park, a national park of Western Tokyo, Japan
- Takiyama Castle (disambiguation)

== People with the surname ==
- Masao Takiyama (滝山 雅夫), Japanese anime producer

== See also ==
- Takayama (disambiguation)
