= Takayama helix =

Scientific classification
- Domain: Eukaryota
- Clade: Diaphoretickes
- Clade: SAR
- Clade: Alveolata
- Phylum: Myzozoa
- Superclass: Dinoflagellata
- Class: Dinophyceae
- Order: Gymnodiniales
- Family: Kareniaceae
- Genus: Takayama
- Species: T. helix

Binomial name
- Takayama helix De Salas et al., 2003

Species of single-celled organism

Takayama helix is a species of dinoflagellate with sigmoid apical grooves first found in Tasmanian and South African waters. It contains fucoxanthin and its derivatives as its main accessory pigments.

Takayama helix has an apical groove being practically straight while still clearly bent. It possesses one ventral pore. It has various peripheral, strap-shaped, spiraling chloroplasts with unique pyrenoids and an ellipsoidal nucleus.
