= Katayama =

Katayama (片山) is a Japanese surname. Notable people with the surname include:

== Entertainers ==
- Sayuri Katayama (片山 沙有里; born 1979), Japanese stage actress
- Hitomi Katayama (片山 瞳; born 1980), Japanese film actress
- Haruka Katayama (片山 陽加; born 1990), Japanese film actress and singer, former AKB48 member

== Politicians ==
- Sen Katayama (片山 潜; 1859–1933), Japanese-born member of the American Communist Party
- Tetsu Katayama (片山 哲; 1887–1978), 46th Prime Minister of Japan
- Toranosuke Katayama (片山 虎之助; 1935–2025), Japanese Osaka Ishin no Kai politician
- Yoshihiro Katayama (片山 善博; born 1951), Democratic Party of Japan politician, former Minister of Internal Affairs and Communications
- Satsuki Katayama (片山 さつき; born 1959), Japanese Liberal Democratic Party politician, former Minister of Finance

== Sportspeople ==
- Toshikazu Katayama (片山 敏一; born 1913), Japanese figure skater
- Hiroshi Katayama (片山 洋; born 1940), Japanese football defender
- Yoshimi Katayama (片山 義美; 1940–2016), Japanese professional Grand Prix motorcycle road racer and auto racer
- Misako Katayama (片山 美佐子; born 1944), Japanese javelin thrower
- Takazumi Katayama (片山 敬済; born 1951), Japanese Grand Prix motorcycle road racing world champion
- Ukyo Katayama (片山 右京; born 1963), Japanese racing driver
- Mizuho Katayama (片山 満津芳; born 1969), synchronized swimming coach in Japan, Olympic competitor for South Korea
- Shingo Katayama (片山 晋呉; born 1973), Japanese golfer
- Tatsuki Katayama (片山 立規; born 1973), Japanese ice hockey player
- Rie Katayama (片山 梨絵; born 1979), Japanese cross-country mountain biker
- Katayama Shinji (片山 伸次; born 1979), Japanese sumo wrestler
- Shosuke Katayama (片山 奨典; born 1983), Japanese football defender (J2 League)
- Masato Katayama (片山 真人; born 1984), Japanese football forward (J2 League)
- Hiroshi Katayama (baseball) (片山 博視; born 1987), Japanese baseball pitcher
- Eiichi Katayama (片山 瑛一; born 1991), Japanese football forward (J2 League)
- Raibu Katayama (片山 來夢; born 1995), Japanese snowboarder
- Nobuaki Katayama, Japanese racing driver and automative engineer

== Writers ==
- Katayama Hiroko (片山 広子; 1878–1958), Japanese poet and translator
- Elizabeth Kata (full name Elizabeth Colina Katayama; 1912–1998), Australian novelist
- Kyoichi Katayama (片山 恭一; born 1959), Japanese novelist best known for Crying Out Love, In the Centre of the World
- Kentarō Katayama (片山 憲太郎; born 1970), Japanese author of light novels

== Other ==
- Katayama Tōkuma (片山 東熊; 1854–1917), Japanese architect who designed the original buildings for the Imperial Nara Museum and Kyoto Imperial museum
- Yutaka Katayama (片山 豊; 1909–2015), Japanese automotive executive best known as the long-time president of Nissan's US operations
- Masamichi Katayama (片山 正通; born 1966), Japanese interior designer
- Akio Katayama (片山 章雄; born 1957), Japanese historian of Inner Asia
- Fred Katayama (born 1960), American television journalist of Japanese descent
- Kazuyoshi Katayama (片山 一良), Japanese animator and director
- Katayama Yōkoku (片山楊谷; 1760-1801), Japanese artist

== See also ==
- Katayama fever, another name for Schistosomiasis
- Katayama Detachment of the Imperial Japanese Army's 2nd Division during World War II
