= 高山 =

高山, meaning "tall mountain(s)", may refer to:

Mandarin Chinese reading Gāoshān:

- Gaoshanzu, the name used in the People's Republic of China to refer to Taiwan aborigines
- Courtesy name of Taiwan-based 20th-century Taoist religious leader Wang Hao-te
- Guqin piece by Spring and Autumn period or Warring States period musician Bo Ya

Cantonese Chinese reading Gōusāan

- Ko Shan Terrace, residential estate in Taikoo Shing, Hong Kong
- Ko Shan Road Park, an urban park

Korean reading Gosan

- Ko San, South Korean astronaut

Japanese kun-yomi Takayama

- Takayama, Gifu, city in Gifu Prefecture, Japan
- Takayama Main Line, train line running between Gifu and Toyama, Japan
- Takayama, Gunma, village in Agatsuma District, Gunma Prefecture, Japan
- Takayama, Nagano, village in Kamitakai District, Nagano Prefecture, Japan

Vietnamese reading Cao Sơn

- Commune Cao Son, district Anh Son, province Nghe An
- Commune Cao Son, district Bach Thong, province Bac Kan
- Commune Cao Son, district Da Bac, province Hoa Binh
- Commune Cao Son, district Luong Son, Hoa Binh province
- Commune Cao Son, district Muong Khuong, province Lao Cai.
- The names of many mountain gods in Vietnam, god Cao Sơn.

== See also ==
- Takayama (disambiguation)
