= Ataru Nakamura =

Japanese singer, songwriter and actress (born 1985)

Ataru Nakamura 中村 中
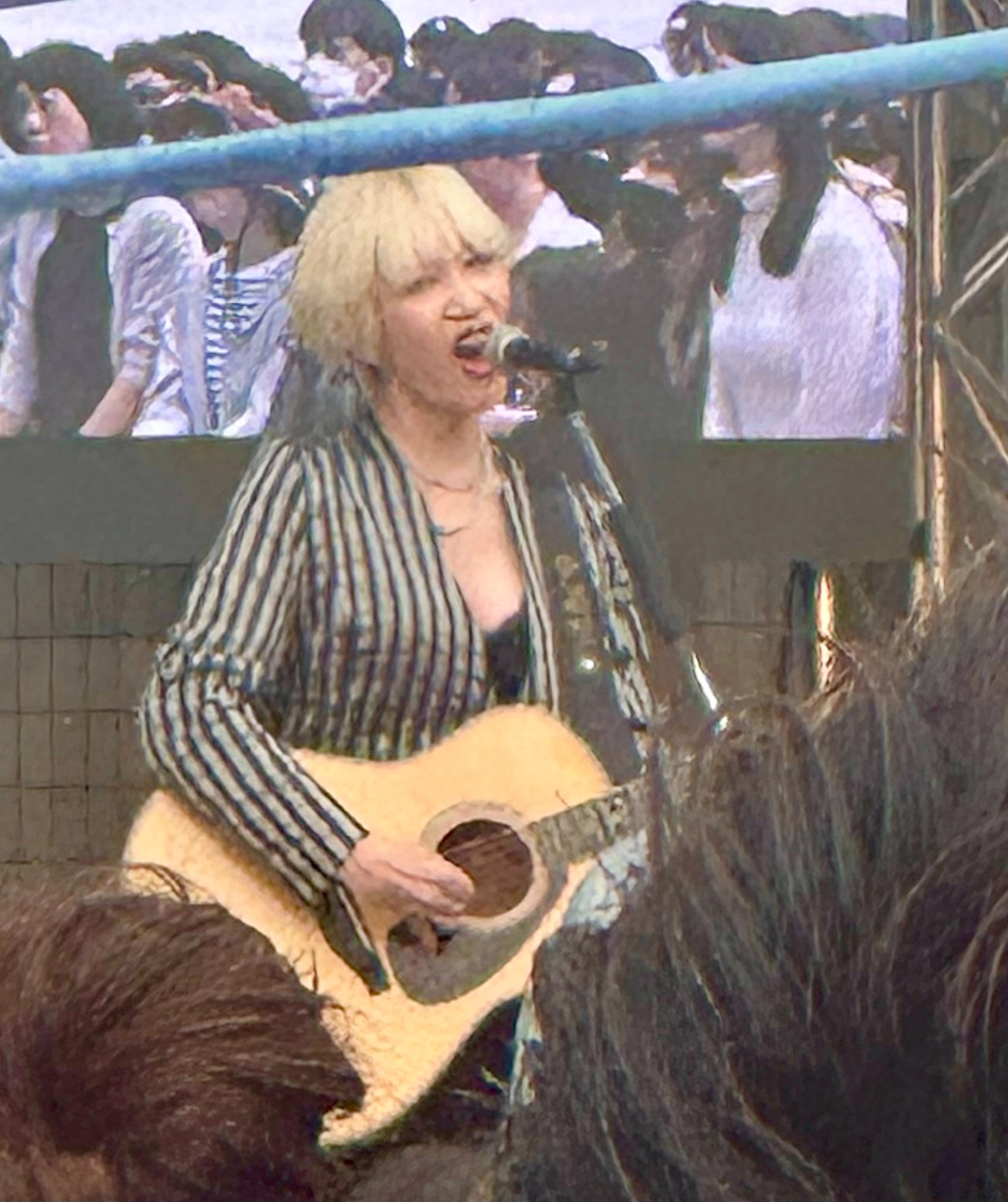
- Nakamura in 2024

Background information
- Born: Ataru Nakamura; 28 June 1985 (age 41)
- Origin: Sumida, Tokyo, Japan
- Genres: Pop
- Occupations: Singer-songwriter; actress
- Instruments: voice; piano; drums; guitar
- Years active: 2004–present
- Labels: P-Pro Music (2005); Avex Trax (2006–2010); Yamaha Music (2010–2013); Imperial Record (2014–present)
- Website: http://www.nakamura-ataru.jp/

Ataru Nakamura (中村 中, Nakamura Ataru) (born 28 June 1985) is a Japanese singer, songwriter and actress. After signing with Avex Trax, Nakamura released her debut single, "Yogoreta Shitagi" in 2006. She attracted public attention after coming out as a transgender woman publicly via her official website on 11 September 2006.

Nakamura's second single "Tomodachi no Uta", which details her struggling with the sexuality and unrequited love for her friend, became her breakthrough hit, reaching number nine in Japan. Her debut studio album, Ten Made Todoke, was released in January 2007 and certificated Gold by Recording Industry Association of Japan. Her fourth studio album Shōnen Shōjo (2010) won the 52nd Japan Record Awards for Excellence Album Award. In May 2011, Nakamura released her first compilation album, Wakage no Itari.

== Early life ==
Ataru Nakamura was born on 28 June 1985, in Sumida, Tokyo. Her parents divorced when she was little, and she was raised by her mother. Nakamura began studying music early in her life, teaching herself to play the piano at the age of ten, and beginning to write her own songs at fifteen.

== Music career ==
=== 2004–2005: Switch to Avex Trax and Ten Made Todoke era ===
In 2006, she switched to a major label, the popular Avex Trax. Her first major label single, "Yogoreta Shitagi", was released on her birthday, and received minor attention. "Yogoreta Shitagi" was written about an ex-boyfriend who was cheating on her and is written from the former boyfriend's point of view. Nakamura called this individual on the telephone to explain that the song she had written about him was to be her debut single.

Her second single, "Tomodachi no Uta", received greater attention, and placed at number 150 on the Oricon charts. However, it was not until Nakamura came out as a transgender female that she received major attention. Her explanation garnered a lot of media attention, and her single rose to number 9 on the Oricon charts. "Tomodachi no Uta" became the theme song for the popular television drama Watashi ga Watashi de Aru Tame ni, a primetime television drama about a young transgender woman. Nakamura even received a small cameo appearance on the program.

Nakamura wrote "Tomodachi no Uta" when she was fourteen years old; notably, it was the first song she ever wrote. She wrote the song to say goodbye to the friends in junior high she would never see again. "Tomodachi no Uta" was featured in an Avex Trax musical titled "Kokoro no Kakera". The soundtrack featured 21 songs chosen from the company's hits over the past two decades.

Her third single, "Watashi no Naka no Ii Onna", entered the Oricon charts at number 39. On the same day "Watashi no Naka no Ii Onna" was released, the song "Chewing Gum" written by Nakamura for the band AAA, debuted on the Oricon chart. Her two songs competed with one another for four weeks.

Her first album, Ten Made Todoke, was released on 1 January 2007. A month later, she released "Kaze ni Naru", her fourth single. "Kaze ni Naru" was the theme song for the film Sakebi.

Her song "Kakeashi no Ikizama" was used as the closing theme for the anime series Reideen.

=== Late 2007–2008: Watashi wo Daite Kudasai era ===
Nakamura's fifth single marked the promotion of her second album titled Watashi wo Daite Kudasai. The album was released on 5 December 2007. "Ringo Uri", the album's first single, premiered on 27 June 2007, and peaked at number 30 on the Oricon charts. The album's second single, "Hadaka Denkyū", premiered on 21 November. "Tori no Mure", the album's third single and her seventh overall, received minor airplay.

=== 2009: Ashita wa Haremasu You Ni era ===
"Kaze Tachinu" debuted on 9 July 2008. The song was used as the theme song for the live-action film GeGeGe no Kitaro Sennen Noroi Uta. The single did well and was received much like "Tomodachi no Uta". Nakamura appeared at AP Bank Fes' 08, a musical festival, on 20 July 2008, to promote the single.

Nakamura released "Kotonakare Shugi", a rock song produced by Kameda Seiji, on 17 December 2008.

She wrote a song called "Hare-butai" for Jero, Japan's first black enka singer.

Ashita wa Haremasu You Ni was Nakamura's third studio album, released on 25 February 2009 in both standard and deluxe editions, the latter containing a DVD containing various performances and music videos.

=== 2010: Shōnen Shōjo era ===
In 2010 Ataru Nakamura switched her management from Avex Trax to Yamaha Music Communications. She released the single "Iede Shoujo," which debuted at No. 90 on the Oricon charts and sold 796 copies the first week. On 9/22 her album came out titled Shōnen Shōjo it debuted at No. 65 on the Oricon and sold 2,103 copies the first week. The album was later awarded a Japan Record Award, despite its lack of commercial success.

== Personal life ==
Nakamura was assigned male at birth but transitioned after struggling with issues of gender identity. This was mentioned in her official biography short during her appearance at the 2007 Kouhaku Uta Gassen.

== Musical style ==
Nakamura is notable for the two different styles in which she sings. Her first style is a modern rock/pop sound. Her second style is an enka-inspired sound; thus far her enka-styled ballads have been her largest successes. Her singles have thus far alternated between these two styles.

== Discography ==
=== Studio albums ===
Title	Details	Peak chart positions		Certifications
Title	Details	JPN Oricon	JPN Hot Sales	Certifications
Ten Made Todoke (天までとどけ; "Reaching Heaven")	Released: January 1, 2007; Label: Avex Trax; Formats: CD, CD+DVD, digital download	26	—	RIAJ: Gold (physical)
Watashi o Daite Kudasai (私を抱いて下さい; "Please Hold Me")	Released: December 5, 2007; Label: Avex Trax; Formats: CD, CD+DVD, digital download	38	—	
Ashita wa Haremasu Yō ni (あしたは晴れますように; "May Tomorrow Be a Clear Day")	Released: February 25, 2009; Label: Avex Trax; Formats: CD, CD+DVD, digital download	59	74	
Shōnen Shōjo (少年少女に; "Boy-Girl")	Released: September 22, 2010; Label: Yamaha Music Communications; Formats: CD, digital download	65	73	
Kikoeru (聞こえる; "I Can Hear It")	Released: April 18, 2012; Label: Yamaha; Formats: CD, digital download	76	61	
Sekai no Mikata (世界のみかた; "Friend to the World")	Released: September 3, 2014; Label: Imperial Records; Formats: CD, 2CD+DVD, digital download	67	52	
Kyonen mo, Kotoshi mo, Rainen mo (去年も、今年も、来年も、; "Last Year, This Year, and Next Year Too")	Released: November 18, 2015; Label: Imperial; Formats: CD, digital download	106	91	
Rutsubo (るつぼ; "Crucible")	Released: December 5, 2018; Label: Imperial; Formats: CD, CD+DVD, digital download	114	89	
Mijuku Mono (未熟もの; "Immature")	Released: January 15, 2020; Label: Imperial; Formats: CD, digital download	89	60	

=== Compilation albums ===
Title	Details	Peak chart positions	
Title	Details	JPN Oricon	JPN Hot Sales
Wakage no Itari (若気の至り; "Youthful Mistakes")	Released: May 11, 2011; Label: Avex Trax; Formats: CD, CD+DVD, digital download	101	79
Watashi (私; "Me")	Released: September 29, 2021; Label: Imperial; Formats: 3CD+3BD	TBA	TBA

=== Extended plays ===
Title	Details	Peak chart positions	
Title	Details	JPN Oricon	JPN Hot Sales
Niban-senji (二番煎じ; "Rehashes")	Released: May 11, 2011; Label: Yamaha; Formats: CD, digital download	102	69
Better Half (ベター・ハーフ, Betā Hāfu)	Released: June 21, 2017; Label: Imperial; Formats: CD, digital download	144	—

=== Singles ===
List of singles, with selected chart positions
Title	Year	Peak chart positions		Certifications	Album
Title	Year	JPN Oricon	JPN Hot	Certifications	Album
"Yogoreta Shitagi" (汚れた下着; "Dirty Underwear")	2006	155	—		Ten Made Todoke
"Tomodachi no Uta" (友達の詩; "Friend Song")	2006	9	— (Note: "Tomodachi no Uta" peaked at number 42 on the Billboard Japan Top Single Sales physical chart, a chat which began tracking sales in January 2008 (two years after its release).)	RIAJ: Platinum (digital); RIAJ: Gold (physical)	Ten Made Todoke
"Watashi no Naka no "Ii Onna"" (私の中の「いい女」; "The 'Good Woman' in Me")	2006	39	—		Ten Made Todoke
"Kaze ni Naru" (風になる; "Become the Wind")	2007	103	—		Ten Made Todoke
"Ringo Uri" (リンゴ売り; "Apple Seller")	2007	30	—		Watashi o Daite Kudasai
"Hadaka Denkyū" (裸電球; "Naked Light Bulb")	2007	87	—		Watashi o Daite Kudasai
"Kaze Tachinu" (風立ちぬ; "The Wind Doesn't Blow")	2008	29	— (Note: "Kaze Tachinu" did not enter the Billboard Japan Hot 100 chart, but peaked at number 31 on the Billboard Japan Top Single Sales physical chart.)		Ashita wa Haremasu Yō ni
"Kotonakare Shugi" (事勿れ主義; "Peace at Any Price")	2008	65	— (Note: "Kotonakare Shugi" did not enter the Billboard Japan Hot 100 chart, but peaked at number 66 on the Billboard Japan Top Single Sales physical chart.)		Ashita wa Haremasu Yō ni
"Iede Shōjo" (家出少女; "Runaway Girl")	2010	90	61		Shōnen Shōjo
"Zutto Kimi o Miteiru" (ずっと君を見ている; "Relentlessly Looking at You")	2012	—	—		A Sower of Seeds: Original Soundtrack
"Ikutoshitsuki" (幾歳月; "How Many Years and Months")	2014	103	67		Sekai no Mikata
"Koko ni Iru yo" (ここにいるよ; "I Am Here")	2015	103	76		Kyonen mo, Kotoshi mo, Rainen mo,
"—" denotes items that did not chart.

==== Promotional singles ====
List of singles, with selected chart positions
Title	Year	Peak chart positions	Album
Title	Year	JPN Hot	Album
"Sekai ga Moetsukiru made" (世界が燃え尽きるまで; "Until the World Burns Out")	2012	50	Kikoeru
"Aibiki no Yoru" (逢いびきの夜; "Night of Snoring")	2012	—	Kyonen mo, Kotoshi mo, Rainen mo,
"Ureshii" (うれしい; "Happy")	2020	—	Mijuku Mono
"—" denotes items that did not chart.

== Filmography ==
- Junction 29 (2019)
- Hazard Lamp (2022)
- Blue Boy Trial (2025), Mei
- This Is I (2026), Aki
