= Takayama tasmanica =

Scientific classification
- Domain: Eukaryota
- Clade: Diaphoretickes
- Clade: SAR
- Clade: Alveolata
- Phylum: Myzozoa
- Superclass: Dinoflagellata
- Class: Dinophyceae
- Order: Gymnodiniales
- Family: Kareniaceae
- Genus: Takayama
- Species: T. tasmanica

Binomial name
- Takayama tasmanica De Salas et al., 2003

Species of single-celled organism

Takayama tasmanica is a species of dinoflagellate with sigmoid apical grooves first found in Tasmanian and South African waters. It contains fucoxanthin and its derivatives as its main accessory pigments.

Takayama tasmanica is similar to Gymnodinium pulchellum in its external morphology, however it differs from them by having two ventral pores, a large horseshoe-shaped nucleus, and its characteristic central pyrenoid with radiating chloroplasts passing through its nucleus. It possesses gyroxanthin-diester and a gyroxanthin-like accessory pigment, which are missing in its sister species T. helix.
