= Tomodachi no Uta =

"Tomodachi no Uta" "友達の詩"

Single by Ataru Nakamura

from the album Ten made Todoke
- Released: June 28, 2005 (indie release); September 6, 2006 (major release); October 5, 2006 (re-release)
- Recorded: 2005 (indie release); 2006 (major release)
- Genre: J-pop, Kayokyoku
- Label: P-PRO MUSIC (indie release) avex (major release)
- Songwriters: Ataru Nakamura; Kiyohide Ura
- Producer: Kiyohide Ura

Ataru Nakamura singles chronology
"Yogoreta Shitagi" (2006)	"Tomodachi no Uta" "友達の詩" (2005)	"Watashi no Naka no "Ii Onna"" (2006)

Music video
- "友達の詩" on YouTube

"Tomodachi no Uta" is the single by Japanese singer Ataru Nakamura for her first studio album, "Ten made Todoke" (2007). It was written by Nakamura herself and Kiyohide Ura.

== Chart performance ==
After its major release from avex, "Tomodachi no Uta" debuted on the Japan Oricon Weekly Singles chart at number 150, and peaked at number 9 in its fifth week. This song sold over 100,000 physical copies and over 250,000 digital copies so far.

== Live performance ==
She performed this song in 58th NHK Kōhaku Uta Gassen, the most popular music TV program in Japan.

== Covers ==
In 2006, Japanese famous female singer Hiromi Iwasaki covered this song in her album "Natural".

== Track listing ==
All lyrics are written by Ataru Nakamura; all music is composed by Ataru Nakamura.

major release
No.	Title	Arranger(s)	Length
1.	"Tomodachi no Uta (友達の詩)"	Kiyohide Ura	5:46
2.	"Jodan nanka ja naikara ne (冗談なんかじゃないからネ)"	Ataru Nakamura	3:49

All lyrics are written by Ataru Nakamura; all music is composed by Ataru Nakamura.

re-release
No.	Title	Arranger(s)	Length
1.	"Tomodachi no Uta (友達の詩)"	Kiyohide Ura	5:46
2.	"Comment (コメント)"

All lyrics are written by Ataru Nakamura; all music is composed by Ataru Nakamura.

indie release
No.	Title	Arranger(s)	Length
1.	"Tomodachi no Uta (友達の詩)"	Kiyohide Ura
2.	"Jodan nanka ja naikara ne (冗談なんかじゃないからネ)"	Ataru Nakamura
3.	"Heya no Katasumi (部屋の片隅)"	Ataru Nakamura

== Charts and certifications ==
=== Weekly charts ===
Chart (2006)	Peak position
Japan Oricon Singles Chart	9

=== Certifications ===
Region	Certifications	Sales/Shipments
Japan (physical)(RIAJ)	Gold	100,000
Japan (digital)(RIAJ)	Platinum	250,000
