= Takayama (surname) =

Takayama (written: 高山 lit. "high mountain") is a Japanese surname. Notable people with the surname include:

- Takayama Chogyū (1871–1902), Japanese writer
- Cyril Takayama (born 1973), illusionist of Okinawan-Japanese and Moroccan-French descent
- Haneko Takayama (born 1975), Japanese writer
- Justo Takayama (c. 1552/1553–1615), Japanese Catholic daimyo
- Kaoru Takayama (高山 薫; born 1988), Japanese footballer
- Katsunari Takayama (born 1983), Japanese professional boxer
- Kazumi Takayama (born 1994), Japanese idol and writer
- Kiyoshi Takayama (born 1947), Japanese yakuza
- Leila A. Takayama, human–computer interaction specialist
- Masataka Takayama (disambiguation), multiple people
- Minami Takayama (born 1964) Japanese voice actress-singer
- Satoshi Takayama (born 1970), Japanese politician
- Satoshi Takayama (politician, born 1986), Japanese politician
- Yoshihiro Takayama (born 1966), Japanese professional wrestler
- Yukiko Takayama (1939/1940–2023), Japanese screenwriter and director

== Fictional characters ==
- Naoto Takayama, a character in the light novel and anime series Rail Wars!
- Haruka Takayama, a character in the manga and anime series Sakura Trick
