= Reideen =

Japanese anime television series

REIDEEN(ライディーン) (Raidīn)
- Genre: Action, mecha
- Created by: Tohokushinsha
- Manga
- Written by: Yoshitake Suzuki
- Illustrated by: Karasuma Tasuku
- Published by: Kadokawa Shoten
- Magazine: Shōnen Ace
- Original run: November 25, 2006 – July 26, 2007
- Volumes: 2
- Anime television series
- Directed by: Mitsuru Hongo
- Written by: Masahiro Yokotani; Mitsuru Hongo
- Music by: Yoshihiro Ike
- Studio: Production I.G.
- Licensed by: NA: Sentai Filmworks
- Original network: Wowow
- Original run: March 3, 2007 – September 1, 2007
- Episodes: 26

Reideen (stylized in all caps) is a Japanese animated television series remake of the 1975 Super Robot anime Reideen The Brave. It was produced by Production I.G and directed by Mitsuru Hongo. It was originally broadcast on the satellite network Wowow in 2007. Sentai Filmworks has licensed the anime for North American release.

The anime series has a two-volume manga counterpart, running in Kadokawa Shoten's Monthly Shōnen Ace from November 25, 2006, to July 26, 2007.

The show is the only entry of the Reideen series to not be animated by Sunrise who previously animated the original 1975 Brave Reideen and the 1996 re-imagining Reideen the Superior.

== Overview ==
Junki Saiga is a normal high school student with a gift in mathematics. His daily routine is disrupted when his family gets news that his father's remains have been discovered - a noted archaeologist and researcher who had gone missing while exploring a site many years before. Among his remains were notes and artifacts that needed to be identified by the family near a notable triangular mountain in Japan known as "Japan's pyramid", a place suspected by some to be man-made.

A meteor containing a strange robotic life-form falls from the sky and begins to cause destruction, putting Junki in danger and causing a mysterious bracelet from his father's research to activate and merge him with an ancient robot buried within the pyramid - a robot the runes describe as Reideen. It is now up to Junki and guardian Reideen to fight against this unknown alien threat from the sky.

As the story progresses attacks come from multiple directions: the main aliens, who only want Reideen's power, and will then raze the Earth and move on; a faction within the Vigilance Corps (similar to Japan's Self Defense Force) that wishes to discredit and remove Reideen in favor of Human-built remote-controlled mecha; and Roxell, an alien with horns on his head who used a similar giant named Gadion on his homeworld, only to be defeated by the overseer aliens, and his planet destroyed. Some of these enemies want Reideen with or without Junki as its pilot/power source, while others just want Junki/Reideen out of the way.

Junki grows continually torn between doing what only he can do, in piloting Reideen against the giant beast machines sent to destroy cities and the landscape, and his enemies' attacks toward him while he does not receive any help from the Vigilance Corps nor his friends.

== Characters ==
The main characters of Reideen. From left to right: Terasaki, Hoshikawa, Maedasaki, Saiga Junki, Midorino, Shiori, Saiga Junki's little sister Kuraka and mother.

=== Vigilance Corps' Shirasagi Unit (aka JSDF) ===
Saiga Junki (才賀 淳貴)
Voiced by: Masataka Azuma
The protagonist of the story. Junki is tall for his age, and more mature than his classmates, but still has a hard time adjusting to the responsibility of being Reideen's pilot in his dual identity.
Maedasaki Taro (前田崎 太郎)
Voiced by: Shinichiro Miki
A Lieutenant in the Vigilance Corps (aka JSDF), he is fascinated by Out of Place Artifacts, which leads him to Reideen and Junki. Maedasaki monitors and tracks Junki on behalf of the VC, but is genuinely concerned about the boy, and treats him as a person, not a tool. Maedasaki is also an audiophile, and employs Junki part-time after school in their undercover vacuum tube business, the better to keep Junki nearby.
Terasaki Soji (寺崎 宗次)
Voiced by: Keiji Fujiwara
A no-nonsense soldier of the Vigilance Corps, with high marks in both hand-to-hand and marksmanship. Terasaki and Hoshikawa are both assigned with Maedasaki to watch over Junki as Reideen's pilot.
Hoshikawa Hana (星川 花)
Voiced by: Takako Honda
Extremely tall for her gender, Hoshikawa is an esper, but not able to completely control her powers of telekinesis, teleportation (of small objects), object reading, and advanced intuition. She relies more on her combat expertise than her powers.

=== Allies ===
Kobayakawa Shiori (小早川 栞)
Voiced by: Yuka Okada
Junki's childhood friend at school who wants to become more, only to be upstaged by Midorino.
Midorino Akira (碧乃 玲)
Voiced by: Saeko Chiba
A mysterious girl with green eyes. Her home was destroyed in Reideen's first battle, so she moved to Tokyo and just happened to join Junki's and Shiori's class.

== Reideen's weapons/equipment ==
The giant Reideen appears as a warrior with a hooded head and feather motif. In reality the giant can transform large pieces of itself into other objects to suit his purpose. The following is a list of weapons/equipment wielded by Reideen:

1. God Arrow - Reideen can materialize a bow and arrow to shoot enemies.
2. God Wand - a magical staff used to find camouflaged colossal beast machines, or split the God Arrow into multiple blasts at target(s).
3. God Sword - used with Junki's boku sword training to destroy the colossal beast machines.
4. God Bird - allows Reideen the ability to fly. A bird head unfolds from Reideen's back, while the arms and legs change to expose ramjet-like engines and streamline the rest of the body. Its bird form can be hardened with a silver coating to pierce through a colossal beast machine's armour. The bird form can fly underwater, but not maneuver well.
5. God Marine - a vehicle which allows Reideen to move swiftly underwater, as well as fly.
6. God Voice - a pulse of rings which go in every direction; it is capable of destroying and capturing targets, and also capable of creating a defensive barrier whilst underwater.
7. God Wind - an attack which Reideen's front armor glows fiery red; pierces through targets.
8. Flash Drive - allows Reideen to move at a lightning quick speed that gives the illusion of teleportation.
9. God Blade - the ultimate sword, a gigantic blade around the size of the moon itself.

== Anime ==
Sentai Filmworks licensed the series in 2014 and released a subtitled DVD set with the first thirteen episodes on December 16.

No.	Title	Original release date
1	"Rebirth of a Legend" "Yomigaeru densetsu" (蘇る伝説)	March 3, 2007
2	"The Legendary Warrior" "Densetsu no yūsha" (伝説の勇者)	March 10, 2007
3	"The Invisible Shadow" "Mienai kage" (見えない影)	March 17, 2007
4	"Fighting the Shadow" "Kage to no tatakai" (影との戦い)	March 24, 2007
5	"The White Herons Gather" "Shirasagi atsumaru" (白鷺集まる)	March 31, 2007
6	"The Bird Which Becomes God" "Kaminaru tori" (神なる鳥)	April 7, 2007
7	"Fresh Wind" "Aratanaru kaze" (新たなる風)	April 14, 2007
8	"Gale Runs Wild" "Hayate bōsō" (疾風暴走)	April 21, 2007
9	"The Person Who Invokes Darkness" "Yami o yobu mono" (闇を呼ぶ者)	April 28, 2007
10	"Tear It Up! The Darkness" "Kirisake! yami o" (切り裂け!闇を)	May 12, 2007
11	"Gadion" "Gadion" (ガディオン)	May 19, 2007
12	"Escape from Outer Space" "Uchuu Kara no Dasshutsu" (宇宙からの脱出)	May 26, 2007
13	"Festival" "Matsuri" (祭)	June 2, 2007
14	"Deep Sea Challenge" "Shinkai Kara Chousen" (深海から挑戦)	June 9, 2007
15	"The Sea's Sleeping Legend" "Umi ni nemuru densetsu" (海に眠る伝説)	June 16, 2007
16	"Skies of Madness" "Kurutta sora" (狂った空)	June 23, 2007
17	"Assault Within a Storm" "Arashi no naka no shuugeki" (嵐の中の襲撃)	June 30, 2007
18	"The Scent of Farewell" "Sayonara no nioi" (さよならの匂い)	July 7, 2007
19	"Undesired Power" "Nazomanu Chikara" (望まぬ力)	July 14, 2007
20	"Stopped Time" "Tomatta jikan" (止まった時間)	July 21, 2007
21	"Strategy Begins to Move" "Ugokidashita bouryaku" (動き出した謀略)	July 28, 2007
22	"Awaken and Fight" "Mezame yo, soshite tatakae" (目覚めよ、そして戦え)	August 4, 2007
23	"Roxell, Again" "Rokuseru, futatabi" (ロクセル、再び)	August 11, 2007
24	"Gadion Stands" "Gadion, tatsu" (ガディオン、立つ)	August 18, 2007
25	"Reideen Recaptures" "Reideen, dakkan" (ライディーン、奪還)	August 25, 2007
26	"Decisive Battle" "Kessen" (決戦)	September 1, 2007

== Music ==
Opening theme
"manacles" by Tomiko Van
Ending theme
"Kakeashi no Ikizama" (駆け足の生き様) by Ataru Nakamura

== Trivia ==
In episode 7 at time 16:30, a scene from the opening sequence of the anime Cromartie High School is recreated with a waist-high view of Junki and the Analysis Section gang strutting in formation down a hallway.
