= Takayama (dinoflagellate) =

Scientific classification
- Domain: Eukaryota
- Clade: Sar
- Clade: Alveolata
- Division: Dinoflagellata
- Class: Dinophyceae
- Order: Gymnodiniales
- Family: Kareniaceae
- Genus: Takayama; De Salas et al., 2003

Species
- See text

Genus of dinoflagellates

Takayama is a genus of athecate dinoflagellates that exists worldwide.

The genus Takayama was first proposed in 2003 and was later classified into the family Kareniaceae, which includes phototrophic dinoflagellates with sigmoid apical grooves. Species of Takayama contain fucoxanthin, a brown accessory pigment, rather than peridinin, which is typically found in most photosynthetic dinoflagellates. Takayama species have been detected in Australia, China, Italy, Japan, Korea, Singapore, and the United States. Some Takayama species have been associated with bloom events and can be toxic to marine organisms. Takayama helix has received public attention because it can kill abalone larvae and has a global distribution. A Takayama bloom in Haizhou Bay in 2020 is the first record of such a bloom in the temperate coastal waters of China.

== Etymology ==
The genus Takayama is named after Dr. Haruyoshi Takayama, whose work drew attention to the importance of apical grooves in unarmored dinoflagellate taxonomy. The etymology is derived from Takayama's name to honor his contributions to the study of dinoflagellate apical grooves. The etymology of the type species Takayama tasmanica is that it is named after the island of Tasmania, in southeastern Australia, where the species was first isolated.

== History ==
The genus Takayama was first proposed by de Salas et al. in 2003 and at this time, two new species were described: Takayama tasmanica and Takayama helix, the type species for Takayama. The genus was named after Dr. Haruyoshi Takayama as his work drew attention to the importance of apical grooves in unarmored dinoflagellate taxonomy. Takayama is characterized by a sigmoid apical groove and fucoxanthin as its main accessory pigment.

Before the formal establishment of the Takayama genus, some of its species were classified under Gymnodinium and Gyrodinium. The taxonomic affinities of species with sigmoid grooves such as Takayama pulchella, T. acrotrocha, and T. cladochroma were unresolved until cultures of Gymnodinium pulchellum-like organisms became available. The spatio-temporal distribution of T. acrotrocha in the Haizhou Bay and its adjacent areas are associated with multiple environmental factors, including temperature, salinity, and nutrient loading. Some Takayama species have been associated with toxic bloom events. A Takayama pulchella bloom in the Indian River (Florida, USA) in 1990 and 1996 caused the deaths of many species of fish and invertebrates.

Phylogenetic analysis shows that the genus Takayama forms a distinct lineage related to Karenia and Karlodinium. Molecular data, particularly LSU rDNA sequences, are essential for identifying Takayama species. A phylogenetic tree inferred from the LSU rDNA showed that the T. acrotrocha from the SCS formed a subclade with the T. acrotrocha from Singapore and T. xiamenensis. This history illustrates the evolving understanding of Takayama, from its initial identification and classification to detailed studies of its ecology, physiology, and potential impacts on marine environments.

== Habitat and ecology ==
The habitat and ecology of Takayama dinoflagellates are complex, involving various environmental factors, trophic modes, and interactions with other organisms. Takayama species have been detected in various regions around the world, including Australia, Asia, Europe, and North America. Takayama tasmanica, the type species of Takayama, was first observed and collected in the Derwent estuary and North West Bay in Tasmania. Takayama helix specifically has a global distribution and has been found in waters of Australia, Japan, New Zealand, South Africa, South Korea, and Spain, where shellfish aquaculture industries are relatively large. Takayama acrotrocha is a eurythermal species recorded in tropical and temperate coastal countries, including China, Singapore, Melbourne, Australia, Japan, and Italy. The first record of a Takayama bloom occurred in the temperate coastal water of China, being recorded in Haizhou Bay

The spatio-temporal distribution of Takayama is associated with multiple environmental factors, including temperature, salinity, and nutrient loading. Takayama acrotrocha had a significant positive correlation with DON (dissolved organic nitrogen), DIP, and DOP, but a significant negative correlation with nitrate and nitrite, implying its adaptability to nutrients featuring high concentrations of DON and DOP and high DIN/DIP ratio. Coastal eutrophication, featuring high concentrations of DON and DOP and high DIN/DIP ratios, allows T. acrotrocha blooms to proliferate. This eutrophication is due to the terrestrial input of nitrogen and phosphorus and the intensive marine agriculture in the area since the early 2000s.

Takayama species can be mixotrophic, combining photosynthesis with the ingestion of other organisms. Determining whether a phototrophic dinoflagellate is exclusively autotrophic or mixotrophic is critical for understanding its dynamics and role in food webs. Takayama helix is a mixotrophic species that can feed on diverse dinoflagellate prey species. The mixotrophic growth rates of T. helix on suitable prey were significantly greater than its autotrophic growth rates. Takayama acrotrocha only had a positive and significant correlation with Protoperidinium, a genus of Dinoflagellate, implying that a predator–prey relationship exists between Protoperidinium and T. acrotrocha, or that both are phagotrophs sharing the same ecological niche

Both autotrophic and mixotrophic growth and ingestion rates of Takayama helix are significantly affected by photon flux density and water temperature. Positive growth rates of Takayama helix at 6–58 μmol photons m⁻² s⁻¹ were observed in both autotrophic and mixotrophic modes. At ≥247 μmol photons m⁻² s⁻¹, the autotrophic growth rates of Takayama helix were negative, but mixotrophy turned these negative rates to positive. Under both autotrophic and mixotrophic conditions, Takayama helix grew at 15–28°C, but not at ≤10 or 30°C.

Some Takayama species have been associated with toxic bloom events. Blooms of several Takayama species, including Takayama tasmanica, are known to cause fish kills. Common heterotrophic protistan predators such as heterotrophic dinoflagellates Gyrodinium dominans, Oxyrrhis marina, Luciella masanensis, and Polykrikos kofoidii did not grow on Takayama helix.

== Description ==
A defining characteristic of the genus Takayama is its sigmoid apical groove, which distinguishes it from related genera like Karenia and Karlodinium, which have linear apical grooves. The apical groove is a crucial feature in unarmored dinoflagellate taxonomy. Takayama species contain fucoxanthin and/or its derivatives as their main accessory pigments. They do not possess peridinin, unlike other Kareniaceae genera. Takayama cells are typically unarmored and cells range from small to medium in size. Takayama acrotrocha cells are small and oval, with a length of 14–20 μm (0.00055–0.00079 in) and a width of 11–17 μm (0.00043–0.00067 in). Takayama tasmanica cells range from 16–27 mm (0.63–1.06 in) long, 14–26 mm (0.55–1.02 in) wide, and 10–20 mm (0.39–0.79 in) thick. Cells can be oval or obovate in shape. Cells are slightly flattened dorso-ventrally, with a length to width ratio of approximately 1.2

The epicone of Takayama is hemispherical and the hypocone is truncated and incised. The posterior of the hypocone is truncated and incised by the sulcus. The cingulum is deeply excavated and wide. The cingulum is displaced approximately 1/4–1/3 of the cell length. A sulcus extends briefly onto the epicone and a tubular structure is observed in the sulcus. A ventral pore, sometimes slit-like, is situated on the left side of the epicone and well above the anterior of the cingulum. A slightly slit-like ventral pore was observed on the swollen structure. A dorsal pore is observed in the posterior end of the apical groove of some (but not all) cells.

The shape and position of the nucleus is a key feature for species identification. It can be oval or cup-shaped, located mostly in the epicone or on the left side of the cell. Takayama acrotrocha has a large, ovoid to cup-shaped nucleus that occupies most of the epicone.Takayama tasmanica has a large horseshoe-shaped nucleus. The nucleus lacks a nuclear capsule or envelope chambers. The nucleus surrounds the central pyrenoid anteriorly and laterally. Takayama helix has a large and solid, normally ellipsoidal nucleus, but with variable shape and position.

Chloroplasts in Takayama can be grouped into two types: those radiating from a central pyrenoid (as seen in T. tasmanica and T. tuberculata) and those containing individual pyrenoids (as seen in T. cladochroma, T. helix, and T. pulchella). Takayama tasmanica has a central pyrenoid with radiating chloroplasts that pass through the nucleus. The central pyrenoid is surrounded by a starch cap. Takayama helix has numerous peripheral, strap shaped, and spiraling chloroplasts with individual pyrenoids. The chloroplasts are arranged in bands and located peripherally, with individual pyrenoids.

A row of amphiesmal knobs is observed on the upper border of the cingulum. A tube-like structure is present in the intercingular region of the sulcus and trichocysts are scattered sparsely in the cell.

== Practical importance ==
Takayama has practical importance due to its involvement in harmful algal blooms (HABs), its ecological roles, and its unique mixotrophic capabilities. Blooms of Takayama have been reported to cause fish kills in several countries, impacting aquaculture and tourism industries. Takayama helix has been shown to kill abalone larvae, posing a threat to abalone farming. The increasing frequency and duration of Kareniaceae HABs, including those caused by Takayama, in coastal waters highlight the need for monitoring and management strategies.

Understanding the trophic mode of Takayama is crucial for comprehending its role in marine food webs and bloom dynamics. Takayama species can be mixotrophic, combining photosynthesis with the ingestion of other organisms, which influences nutrient cycling and energy flow in planktonic communities. The ability of Takayama to feed on toxic dinoflagellates suggests it could play a role in controlling populations of harmful algae' However, the effectiveness of Takayama as a grazer may vary depending on the species and environmental conditions. Differential feeding by Takayama tasmanica and T. helix may differentially affect the dynamics of red-tide dinoflagellates. Light intensity and temperature are critical factors affecting the survival and growth of Takayama helix. Mixotrophy can be a survival strategy against photoinhibition.

The ability of Takayama to utilize DON and DOP may contribute to its proliferation in waters with high nutrient loading from agricultural runoff, industrial effluents, and mariculture activities. Accurate identification of Takayama species is crucial for assessing the potential risks associated with their blooms. Monitoring the presence and abundance of Takayama in coastal waters is important for early detection of HABs and implementation of mitigation measures. Mass cultures of dinoflagellates like Takayama could be used for useful materials such as omega 3, pigments, and toxins.

== List of species ==
The genus Takayama includes several species;

- Takayama acrotrocha
- Takayama cladochroma
- Takayama helix
- Takayama pulchella
- Takayama tasmanica (type species)
- Takayama tuberculata
- Takayama xiamenensis
