= Nobuaki Katayama =

Japanese automotive engineer

- Born: Japan
- Engineering career
- Employer: Toyota Motor Corporation
- Projects: AE86
- Significant design: Lexus IS; Lexus SC; Toyota Supra

Nobuaki Katayama is a Japanese automotive engineer and former racing driver who was the chief engineer for the first generation Lexus IS, the Toyota Altezza in Japan, the first generation Lexus SC 400/SC 300, and the 4th generation of the Toyota Supra. Previously, he was an engineer on the AE86 project, and also worked for four years on Toyota Motorsports' World Rally Championship and Le Mans programs.

== Career ==
Katayama joined Toyota Motor Corporation in 1970, where he spent years working in manual transmission design. In 1989, he joined the company's motorsport division. Through the 1990s, Katayama worked in Europe as an executive in Toyota's Motorsports division, where he assisted in World Rally Championship, Sports Car World Championship, and Le Mans racing. He also competed in rallies and other races. From 1994 onward, he worked as the chief engineer of the fourth generation of the Toyota Supra performance coupe. He also worked on the first generation Lexus SC coupes, the SC 400 and SC 300, and then the first Lexus IS.

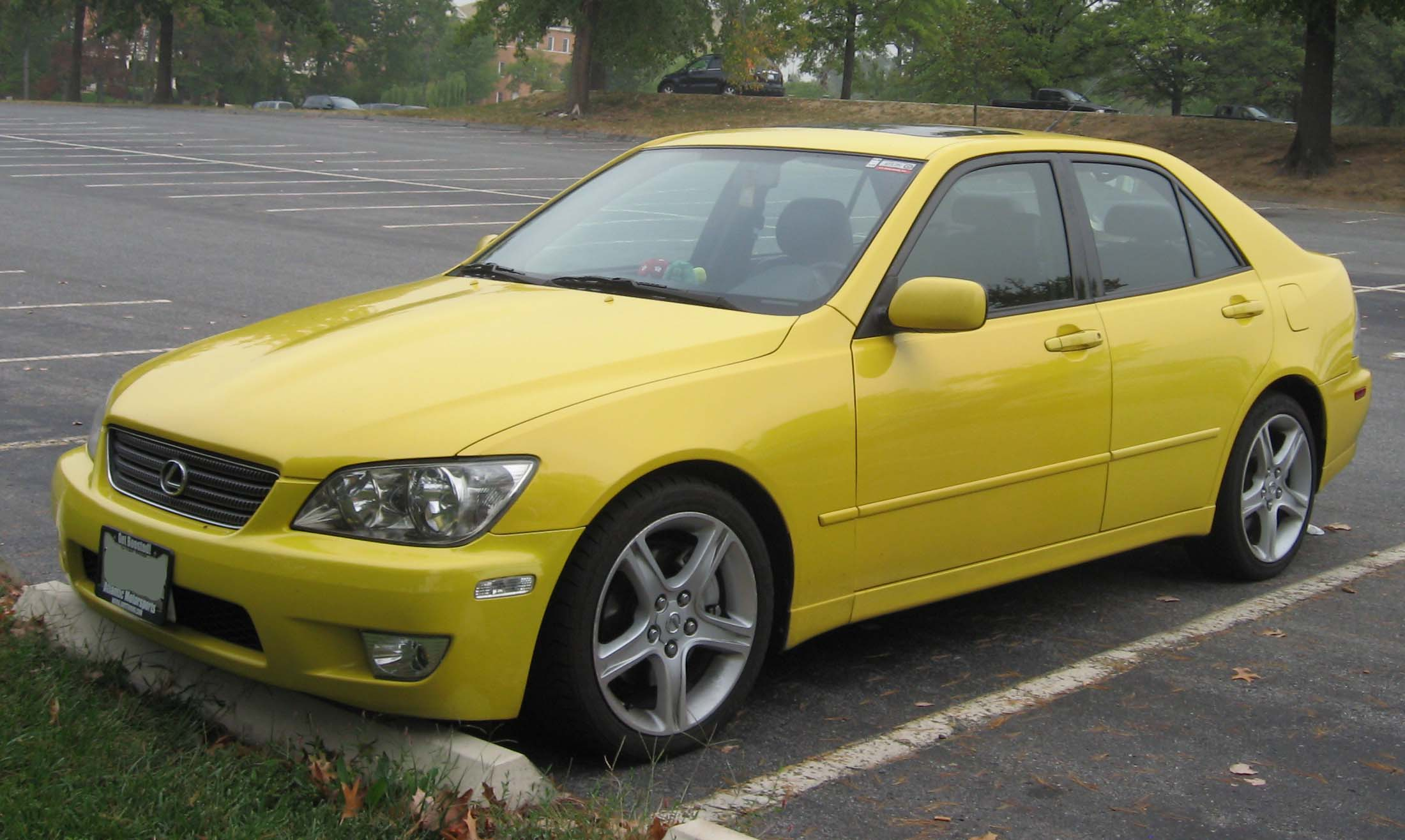
Nobuaki Katayama headed the development of the first Lexus IS

With the first generation Lexus IS, Katayama aimed to build a smaller, more compact Lexus intended for volume sales in the large entry-luxury market, with a front engine/rear drive design. In doing so, Katayama utilized the suspension system of the larger Lexus GS performance sedans, chronometer instrument displays, and drilled aluminum throttle, brake, and accelerator pedals. The drilled pedals were inspired by his teenage son, who had used such a pedal in his car. The vehicle was also fitted with room for modifications; Katayama's personal Altezza was fitted with a supercharger, stiffer suspension, and lowered height. The resulting design received critical acclaim at its 1998 launch, and was awarded Japan's "Car of the Year" honor for 1998-1999. However, Katayama also felt that the design could be further improved, and developed a list of items he suggested be addressed for the second generation Lexus IS design.
