= Tamayama =

Tamayama may refer to:

- Tamayama, Iwate, a former village located in Iwate District, Iwate, Japan
- Tamayama Formation, a Mesozoic geologic formation

== People with the surname ==
- Tetsuji Tamayama (born 1980), Japanese actor
