= Takiyama Castle =

There are three castles named the Takiyama Castle (滝山城, Taki-yama-jō), in Japan.

- Takiyama Castle (Tokyo), Hachiōji, Tokyo.
- Takiyama Castle (Hyōgo), Kōbe, Hyōgo.
- Takiyama Castle (Aichi), Okazaki, Aichi.
