= Masataka Azuma =

Japanese voice actor from Tokyo, Japan

Masataka Azuma (我妻 正崇, Azuma Masataka; born January 25) is a Japanese voice actor from Tokyo, Japan.

== Notable Roles ==
=== Anime ===
==== 2005 ====
- Kaiketsu Zorori (Hawke)

==== 2006 ====
- Nana (Staff)
- Pocket Monsters: Diamond & Pearl (Roark)
- Ghost Slayers Ayashi (Young Samurai)

==== 2007 ====
- REIDEEN (Junki Saiga)
- Mobile Suit Gundam 00 (Lichtendahl Tsery)

==== 2008 ====
- Macross Frontier (Clerk)
- Allison & Lillia (Villagers, Audience)
- To Love-Ru (Catcher, Tsure)
- CLANNAD: After Story (Student)
- Linebarrels of Iron (Student, High School Students)

==== 2009 ====
- Jewelpet (Naoto)
- Juden Chan (Man)

=== Film ===
==== 2007 ====
- Nezumi Monogatari - George to Gerald no Bōken (Nezumi)

==== 2010 ====
- Mobile Suit Gundam 00 the Movie: A Wakening of the Trailblazer (Lichtendahl Tsery)
