= Masataka Takayama =

Masataka Takayama may refer to:

- Masataka Takayama (boxer) (高山 将孝, born 1945), Japanese boxer
- Masataka Takayama (photographer) (高山 正隆, 1895–1981), Japanese photographer
