= Fucoxanthin =

Names
- IUPAC name (3S,5R,6M,3′S,5′R,6′S)-5′,6′-Epoxy-5,3′-dihydroxy-8′-oxo-6,7-didehydro-5,6,5′,6′,7′,8′-hexahydro-β,β-caroten-3-yl acetate
- Systematic IUPAC name (1S,3R,4M)-3-Hydroxy-4-{(3E,5E,7E,9E,11E,13E,15E,17E)-18-[(1S,4S,6R)-4-hydroxy-2,2,6-trimethyl-7-oxabicyclo[4.1.0]heptan-1-yl]-3,7,12,16-tetramethyl-17-oxooctadeca-1,3,5,7,9,11,13,15,17-nonaen-1-ylidene}-3,5,5-trimethylcyclohexyl acetate

Identifiers
CAS Number	3351-86-8
3D model (JSmol)	Interactive image
Beilstein Reference	6580822
ChEBI	CHEBI:5186
ChEMBL	ChEMBL1575074
ChemSpider	21864745
ECHA InfoCard	100.212.315
EC Number	686-524-6
KEGG	C08596
PubChem CID	5281239
UNII	06O0TC0VSM
- InChI: InChI=1S/C42H58O6/c1-29(18-14-19-31(3)22-23-37-38(6,7)26-35(47-33(5)43)27-40(37,10)46)16-12-13-17-30(2)20-15-21-32(4)36(45)28-42-39(8,9)24-34(44)25-41(42,11)48-42/h12-22,34-35,44,46H,24-28H2,1-11H3/b13-12+,18-14+,20-15+,29-16+,30-17+,31-19+,32-21+/t23-,34-,35-,40+,41+,42-/m0/s1 Key: SJWWTRQNNRNTPU-XJUZQKKNSA-N; InChI=1/C42H58O6/c1-29(18-14-19-31(3)22-23-37-38(6,7)26-35(47-33(5)43)27-40(37,10)46)16-12-13-17-30(2)20-15-21-32(4)36(45)28-42-39(8,9)24-34(44)25-41(42,11)48-42/h12-22,34-35,44,46H,24-28H2,1-11H3/b13-12+,18-14+,20-15+,29-16+,30-17+,31-19+,32-21+/t23-,34-,35-,40+,41+,42-/m0/s1 Key: SJWWTRQNNRNTPU-XJUZQKKNBP
- SMILES: CC(=CC=CC=C(C)C=CC=C(C)C(=O)CC12C(CC(CC1(O2)C)O)(C)C)C=CC=C(C)C=C=C3C(CC(CC3(C)O)OC(=O)C)(C)C

Properties
Chemical formula	C_{42}H_{58}O_{6}
Molar mass	658.920 g·mol^{−1}

Hazards
- GHS labelling
Pictograms	(GHS07: Exclamation mark)
Signal word	Warning
Hazard statements	H319
Precautionary statements	P264, P280, P305+P351+P338, P337+P313
- Except where otherwise noted, data are given for materials in their standard state (at 25 °C [77 °F], 100 kPa). verify (what is ?) Infobox references

Fucoxanthin is a xanthophyll, with formula C_{42}H_{58}O_{6}. It is found as an accessory pigment in the chloroplasts of brown algae and most other heterokonts, giving them a brown or olive-green color. Fucoxanthin absorbs light primarily in the blue-green to yellow-green part of the visible spectrum, peaking at around 510–525 nm and absorbing significantly in the range of 450 to 540 nm.

== Function ==
Carotenoids are pigments produced by plants and algae and play a role in light harvesting as part of the photosynthesis process. Xanthophylls are a subset of carotenoids, identified by the fact that they are oxygenated either as hydroxyl groups or as epoxide bridges. This makes them more water soluble than carotenes such as beta-carotene. Fucoxanthin is a xanthophyll that contributes more than 10% of the estimated total production of carotenoids in nature. It is an accessory pigment found in the chloroplasts of many brown macroalgae, such as Fucus spp., and the golden-brown unicellular microalgae, the diatoms. It absorbs blue and green light at bandwidth 450–540 nm, imparting a brownish-olive color to algae. Fucoxanthin has a highly unique structure that contains both an epoxide bond and hydroxyl groups along with an allenic bond (two adjacent carbon-carbon double bonds) and a conjugated carbonyl group (carbon-oxygen double bond) in the polyene chain. All of these features provide fucoxanthin with powerful antioxidant activity.

In macroalgal plastids, fucoxanthin acts like an antenna for light harvesting and energy transfer in the photosystem light harvesting complexes. In diatoms like Phaeodactylum tricornutum, fucoxanthin is protein-bound along with chlorophyll to form a light harvesting protein complex. Fucoxanthin is the dominant carotenoid, responsible for up to 60% of the energy transfer to chlorophyll a in diatoms. When bound to protein, the absorption spectrum of fucoxanthin expands from 450–540 nm to 390–580 nm, a range that is useful in aquatic environments.

== Sources ==
Fucoxanthin is present in brown seaweeds and diatoms and was first isolated from Fucus, Dictyota, and Laminaria by Willstätter and Page in 1914. Seaweeds are commonly consumed in south-east Asia and certain countries in Europe, while diatoms are single-cell planktonic microalgae characterized by a golden-brown color, due to their high content of fucoxanthin. Generally, diatoms contain up to four times more fucoxanthin than seaweed, making diatoms a viable source for fucoxanthin industrially. Diatoms can be grown in controlled environments (such as photobioreactors).

== Bioavailability ==
Limited studies of fucoxanthin in humans indicate low bioavailability.

== See also ==
- Chlorophyll
