= Zooplankton =

Heterotrophic protistan or metazoan members of the plankton ecosystem

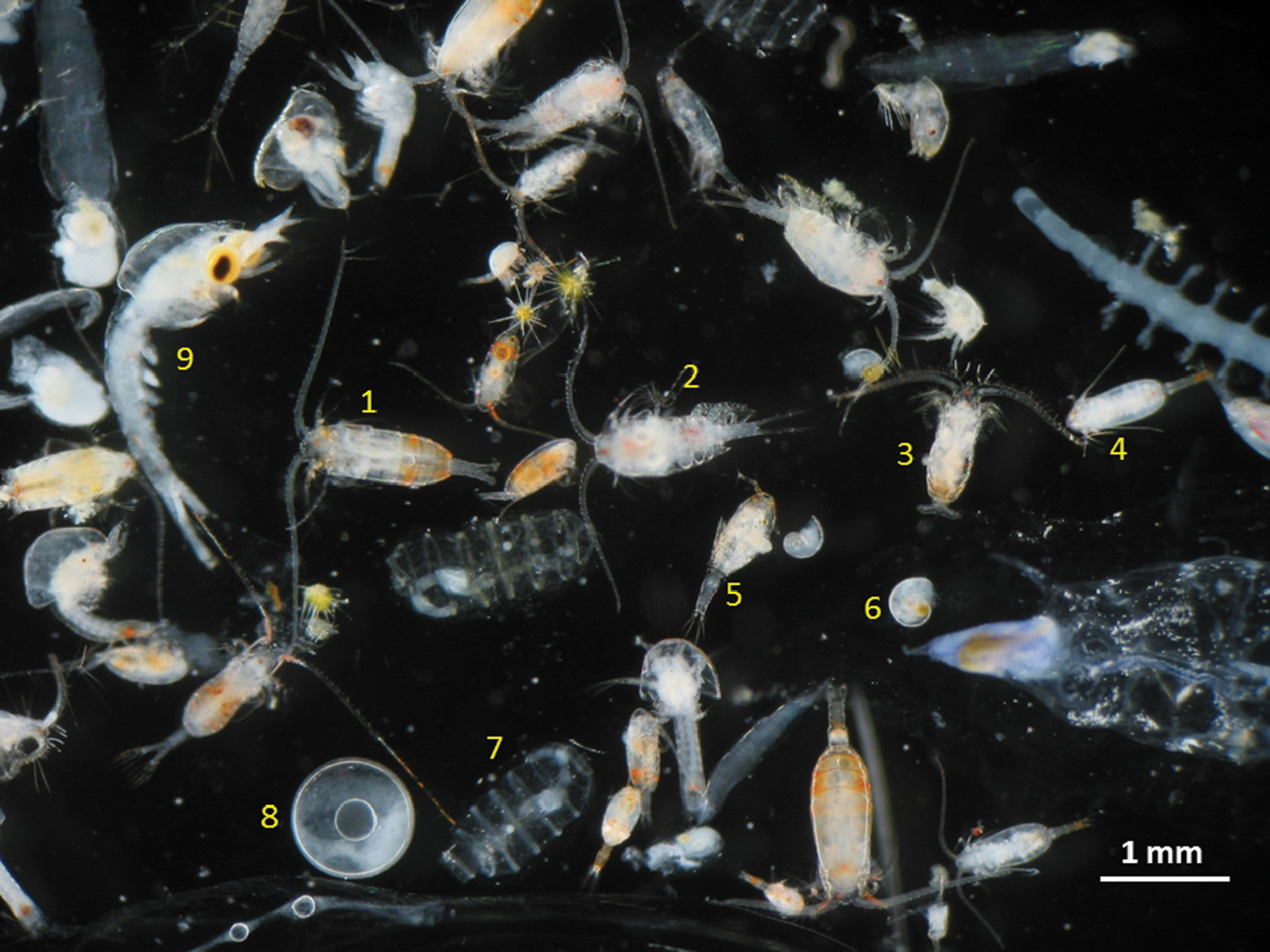
Zooplankton sample including several species of copepods (1–5), gastropod larva (6) doliolids (7), fish eggs (8), and decapod larva (9) (Photo by Iole Di Capua)

Zooplankton are the heterotrophic component of the planktonic community, having to consume other organisms to thrive. The name comes from Ancient Greek ζῷον (zōîon), meaning "animal", and πλαγκτός (planktós), meaning "drifter, wanderer, roamer", and thus, "animal drifter". Plankton are aquatic organisms that are unable to swim effectively against currents. Consequently, they drift or are carried along by currents in the ocean, or by currents in seas, lakes or rivers.

Zooplankton can be contrasted with phytoplankton (cyanobacteria and microalgae), which are the plant-like component of the plankton community (the "phyto-" prefix comes from Ancient Greek: φῠτόν, romanized: phutón, lit. 'plant', although taxonomically not plants). Zooplankton are heterotrophic (other-feeding), whereas phytoplankton are autotrophic (self-feeding), often generating biological energy and macromolecules through chlorophyllic carbon fixation using sunlight – in other words, zooplankton cannot manufacture their own food, while phytoplankton can. As a result, zooplankton must acquire nutrients by feeding on other organisms such as phytoplankton, which are generally smaller than zooplankton. Most zooplankton are microscopic but some (such as jellyfish) are macroscopic, meaning they can be seen with the naked eye.

Many protozoans (single-celled protists that prey on other microscopic life) are zooplankton, including zooflagellates, foraminiferans, radiolarians, some dinoflagellates and marine microanimals. Macroscopic zooplankton include pelagic cnidarians, ctenophores, molluscs, arthropods and tunicates, as well as planktonic arrow worms and bristle worms.

The distinction between autotrophy and heterotrophy often breaks down in very small organisms. Recent studies of marine microplankton have indicated over half of microscopic plankton are mixotrophs, which can obtain energy and carbon from a mix of internal plastids and external sources. Many marine microzooplankton are mixotrophic, which means they could also be classified as phytoplankton.

== Overview ==
Zooplankton (/ˈzoʊ.əplæŋktən/; /ˌzoʊ.əˈplæŋktən/) are heterotrophic (sometimes detritivorous) plankton. The word zooplankton is derived from Ancient Greek: ζῷον, romanized: zôion, lit. 'animal'; and πλᾰγκτός, planktós, 'wanderer; drifter'.

Zooplankton is a categorization spanning a range of organism sizes including small protozoans and large metazoans. It includes holoplanktonic organisms whose complete life cycle lies within the plankton, as well as meroplanktonic organisms that spend part of their lives in the plankton before graduating to either the nekton or a sessile, benthic existence. Although zooplankton are primarily transported by ambient water currents, many have locomotion, used to avoid predators (as in diel vertical migration) or to increase prey encounter rate.

Just as any species can be limited within a geographical region, so are zooplankton. However, species of zooplankton are not dispersed uniformly or randomly within a region of the ocean. As with phytoplankton, 'patches' of zooplankton species exist throughout the ocean. Though few physical barriers exist above the mesopelagic, specific species of zooplankton are strictly restricted by salinity and temperature gradients, while other species can withstand wide temperature and salinity gradients. Zooplankton patchiness can also be influenced by biological factors, as well as other physical factors. Biological factors include breeding, predation, concentration of phytoplankton, and vertical migration. The physical factor that influences zooplankton distribution the most is mixing of the water column (upwelling and downwelling along the coast and in the open ocean) that affects nutrient availability and, in turn, phytoplankton production.

Through their consumption and processing of phytoplankton and other food sources, zooplankton play a role in aquatic food webs, as a resource for consumers on higher trophic levels (including fish), and as a conduit for packaging the organic material in the biological pump. Since they are typically small, zooplankton can respond rapidly to increases in phytoplankton abundance, for instance, during the spring bloom. Zooplankton are also a key link in the biomagnification of pollutants such as mercury.

Typical models featuring zooplankton

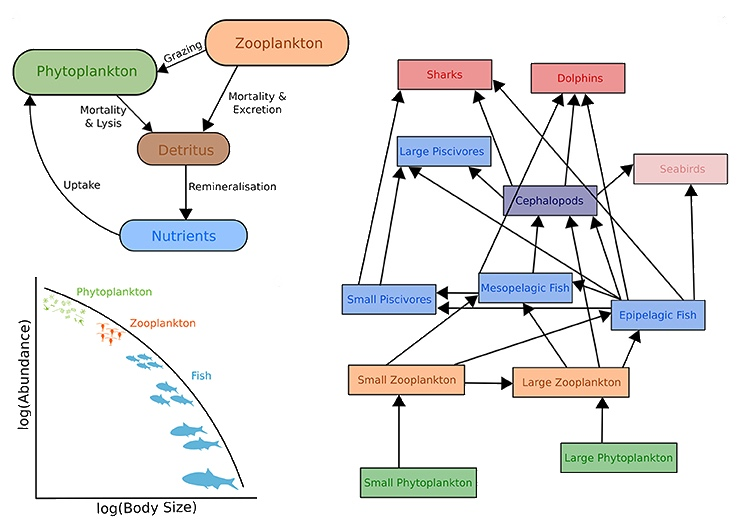
Upper left: Biogeochemical models Right: Ecosystem models
Lower left: Size-spectra models
These models also have temporal and spatial components.

Ecologically important protozoan zooplankton groups include the foraminiferans, radiolarians and dinoflagellates (the last of these are often mixotrophic). Important metazoan zooplankton include cnidarians such as jellyfish and the Portuguese Man o' War; crustaceans such as cladocerans, copepods, ostracods, isopods, amphipods, mysids and krill; chaetognaths (arrow worms); molluscs such as pteropods; and chordates such as salps and larval fish. This wide phylogenetic range includes a similarly wide range in feeding behavior: filter feeding, predation and symbiosis with autotrophic phytoplankton as seen in corals. Zooplankton feed on bacterioplankton, phytoplankton, other zooplankton (sometimes cannibalistically), detritus (or marine snow) and even nektonic organisms. As a result, zooplankton are primarily found in surface waters where food resources (phytoplankton or other zooplankton) are abundant.

Zooplankton can also act as a disease reservoir. Crustacean zooplankton have been found to house the bacterium Vibrio cholerae, which causes cholera, by allowing the cholera vibrios to attach to their chitinous exoskeletons. This symbiotic relationship enhances the bacterium's ability to survive in an aquatic environment, as the exoskeleton provides the bacterium with carbon and nitrogen.

== Size classification ==
Body size has been defined as a "master trait" for plankton as it is a morphological characteristic shared by organisms across taxonomy that characterises the functions performed by organisms in ecosystems. It has a paramount effect on growth, reproduction, feeding strategies and mortality. One of the oldest manifestations of the biogeography of traits was proposed over 170 years ago, namely Bergmann's rule, in which field observations showed that larger species tend to be found at higher, colder latitudes.

In the oceans, size is critical in determining trophic links in planktonic ecosystems and is thus a critical factor in regulating the efficiency of the biological carbon pump. Body size is sensitive to changes in temperature due to the thermal dependence of physiological processes. The plankton is mainly composed of ectotherms which are organisms that do not generate sufficient metabolic heat to elevate their body temperature, so their metabolic processes depends on external temperature. Consequently, ectotherms grow more slowly and reach maturity at a larger body size in colder environments, which has long puzzled biologists because classic theories of life-history evolution predict smaller adult sizes in environments delaying growth. This pattern of body size variation, known as the temperature-size rule (TSR), has been observed for a wide range of ectotherms, including single-celled and multicellular species, invertebrates and vertebrates.

The processes underlying the inverse relationship between body size and temperature remain to be identified. Despite temperature playing a major role in shaping latitudinal variations in organism size, these patterns may also rely on complex interactions between physical, chemical and biological factors. For instance, oxygen supply plays a central role in determining the magnitude of ectothermic temperature-size responses, but it is hard to disentangle the relative effects of oxygen and temperature from field data because these two variables are often strongly inter-related in the surface ocean.

Zooplankton can be broken down into size classes which are diverse in their morphology, diet, feeding strategies, etc. both within classes and between classes:

| Type of zooplankton | Size range |
|---|---|
| picozooplankton | $<$2μm |
| nanozooplankton | 2–20μm |
| microzooplankton | 20–200μm |
| mesozooplankton | 0.2–20 millimeters |

=== Microzooplankton ===
Microzooplankton are defined as heterotrophic and mixotrophic plankton. They primarily consist of phagotrophic protists, including ciliates, dinoflagellates, and mesozooplankton nauplii. Microzooplankton are major grazers of the plankton community. As the primary consumers of marine phytoplankton, microzooplankton consume ~ 59–75% daily of the marine primary production, much larger than mesozooplankton. That said, macrozooplankton can sometimes have greater consumption rates in eutrophic ecosystems because the larger phytoplankton can be dominant there. Microzooplankton are also pivotal regenerators of nutrients which fuel primary production and food sources for metazoans.

Despite their ecological importance, microzooplankton remain understudied. Routine oceanographic observations seldom monitor microzooplankton biomass or herbivory rate, although the dilution technique, an elegant method of measuring microzooplankton herbivory rate, has been developed for over four decades (Landry and Hassett 1982). The number of observations of microzooplankton herbivory rate is around 1600 globally, far less than that of primary productivity (> 50,000). This makes validating and optimizing the grazing function of microzooplankton difficult in ocean ecosystem models.

=== Mesozooplankton ===
Mesozooplankton are one of the larger size classes of zooplankton. In most regions, mesozooplankton are dominated by copepods, such as Calanus finmarchicus and Calanus helgolandicus. Mesozooplankton are an important prey for fish.

As plankton are rarely fished, it has been argued that mesoplankton abundance and species composition can be used to study marine ecosystems' response to climate change. This is because they have life cycles that generally last less than a year, meaning they respond to climate changes between years. Sparse, monthly sampling will still indicate vacillations.

== Sampling methods ==
Research vessels collect zooplankton from the ocean using fine mesh nets. The vessels either tow the nets through the sea or pump sea water onboard and then pass it through the net.

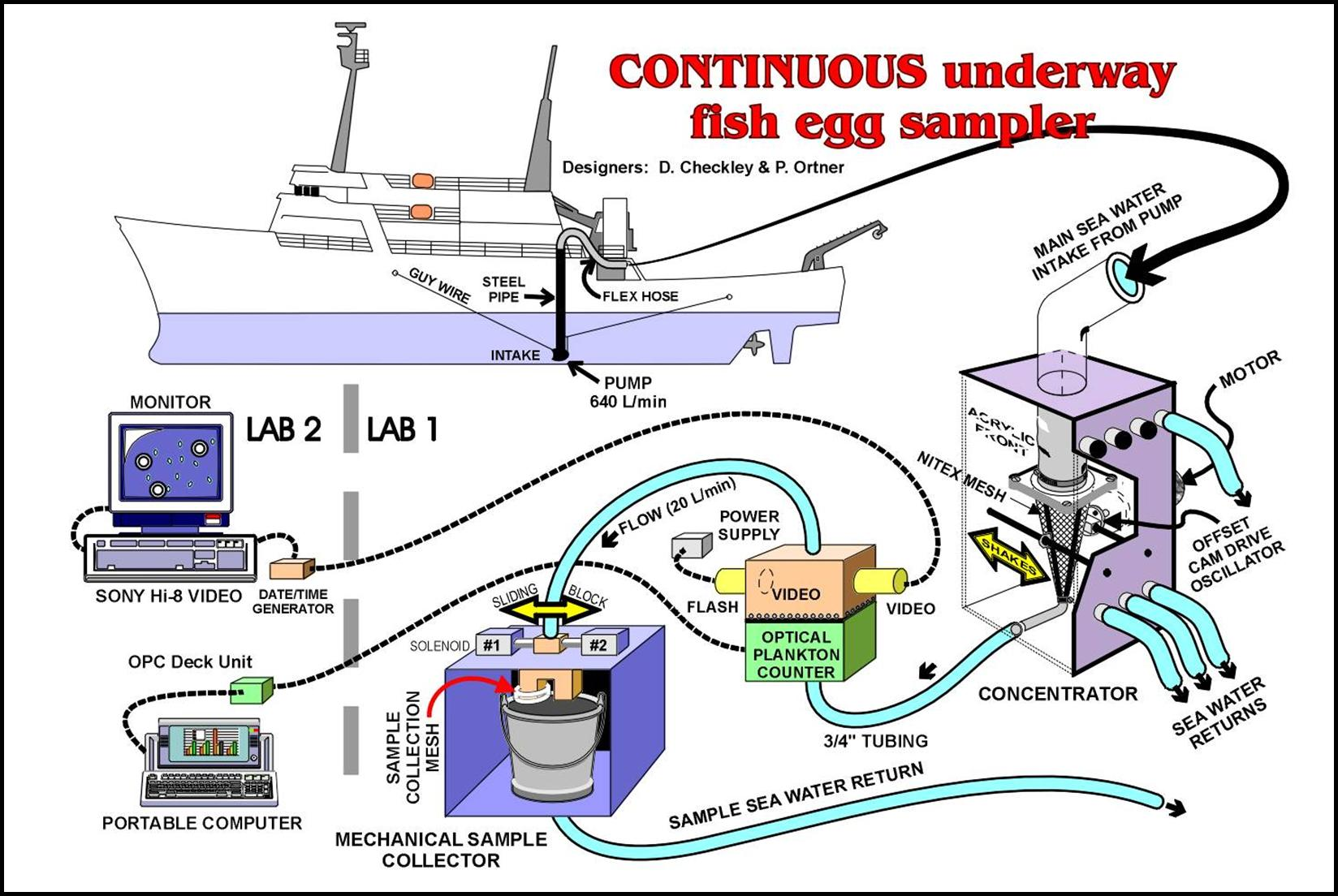
Illustration showing the collection method using a Continuous Underway Fish Egg Sampler (CUFES).

There are many types of plankton tows:

- Neuston net tows are often made at or just below the surface using a nylon mesh net fitted to a rectangular frame
- The PairoVET tow, used for collecting fish eggs, drops a net about 70 metres into the sea from a stationary research vessel and then drags it back to the vessel.
- Ring net tows involve a nylon mesh net fitted to a circular frame. These have largely been replaced by bongo nets, which provide duplicate samples with their dual-net design.
- The bongo tow drags nets shaped like bongo drums from a moving vessel. The net is often lowered to about 200 metres and then allowed to rise to the surface as it is towed. In this way, a sample can be collected across the whole photic zone where most ichthyoplankton is found.
- MOCNESS and BIONESS tows and Tucker trawls utilize multiple nets that are mechanically opened and closed at discrete depths in order to provide insights into the vertical distribution of the plankton
- The manta trawl tows a net from a moving vessel along the surface of the water, collecting larvae, such as grunion, mahi-mahi, and flying fish which live at the surface.

After the tow the plankton is flushed with a hose to the cod end (bottom) of the net for collection. The sample is then placed in preservative fluid prior to being sorted and identified in a laboratory.

In addition to net tows, plankton such as ichthyoplankton is collected with the help of plankton pumps. In this method, the research vessel moves while using a Continuous Underway Fish Egg Sampler (CUFES). Water is pumped aboard the vessel from a depth of 3 metres at 640 liters/min. The water is then sent through a concentrator where it passes through a net, and the plankton is diverted to a collector. While the CUFES runs, a data logger records the date, time, and position for each sample as well as other environmental data from the ship's sensors (e.g. wind speed, direction, SST).

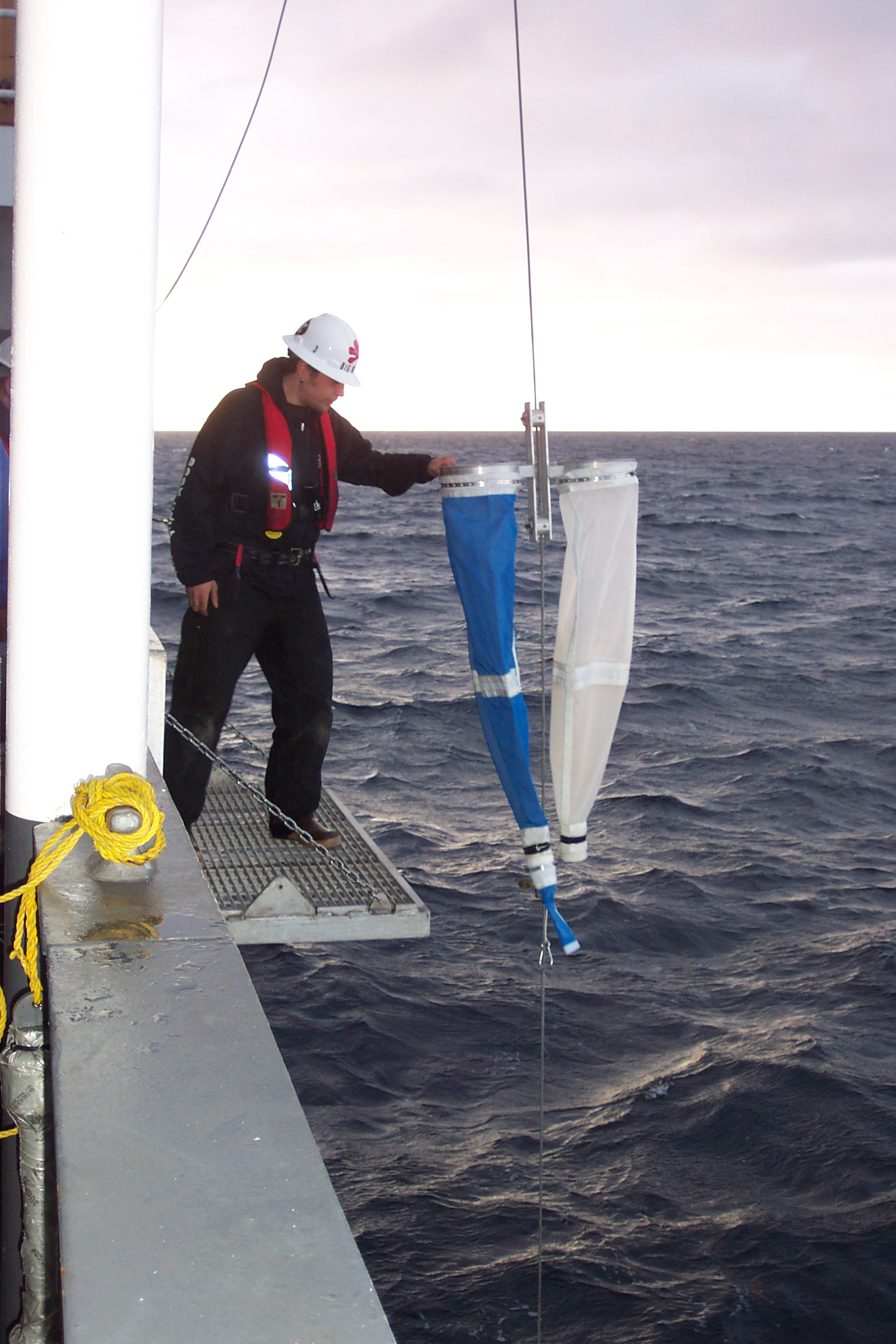
PairoVET tow

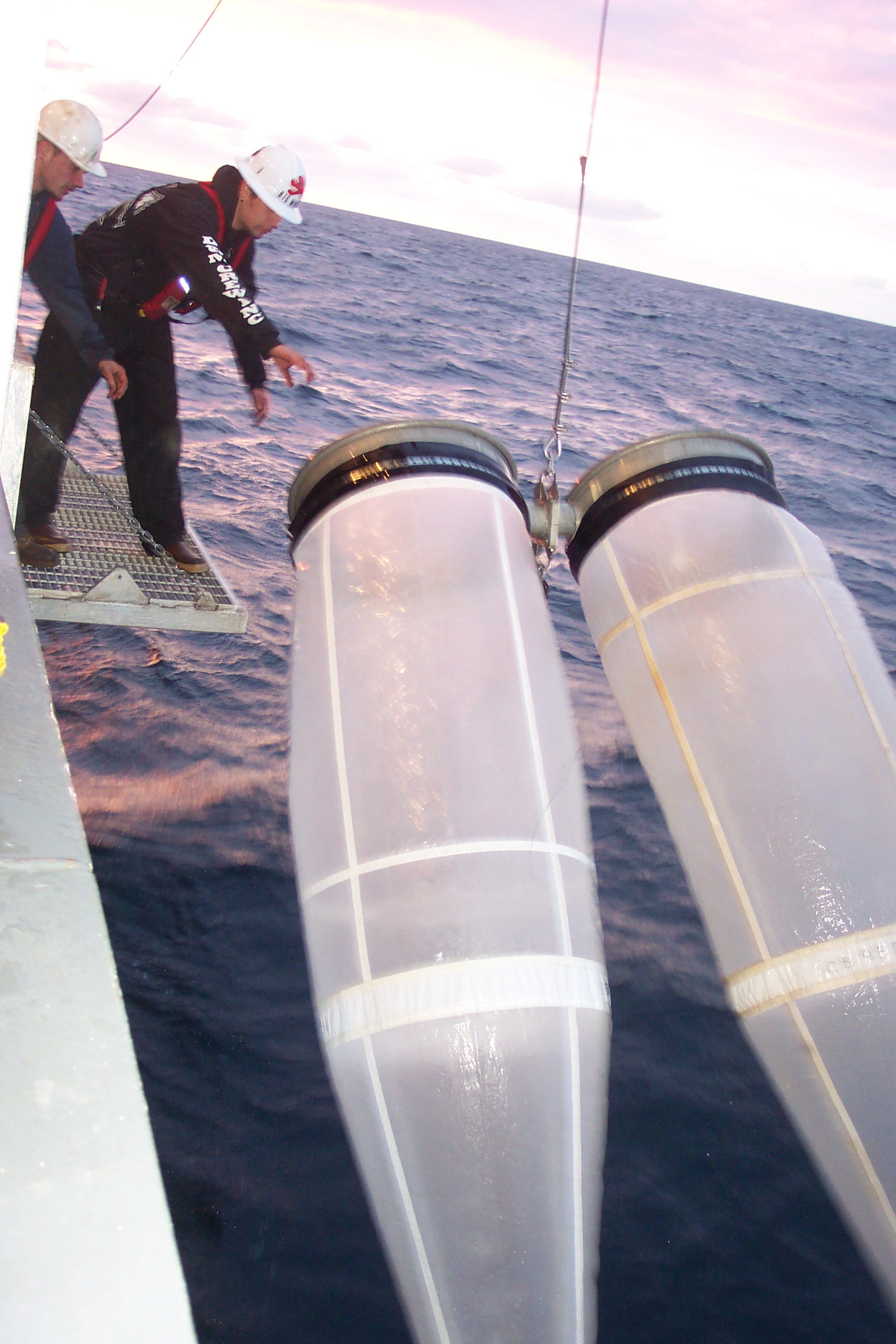
Bongo tow

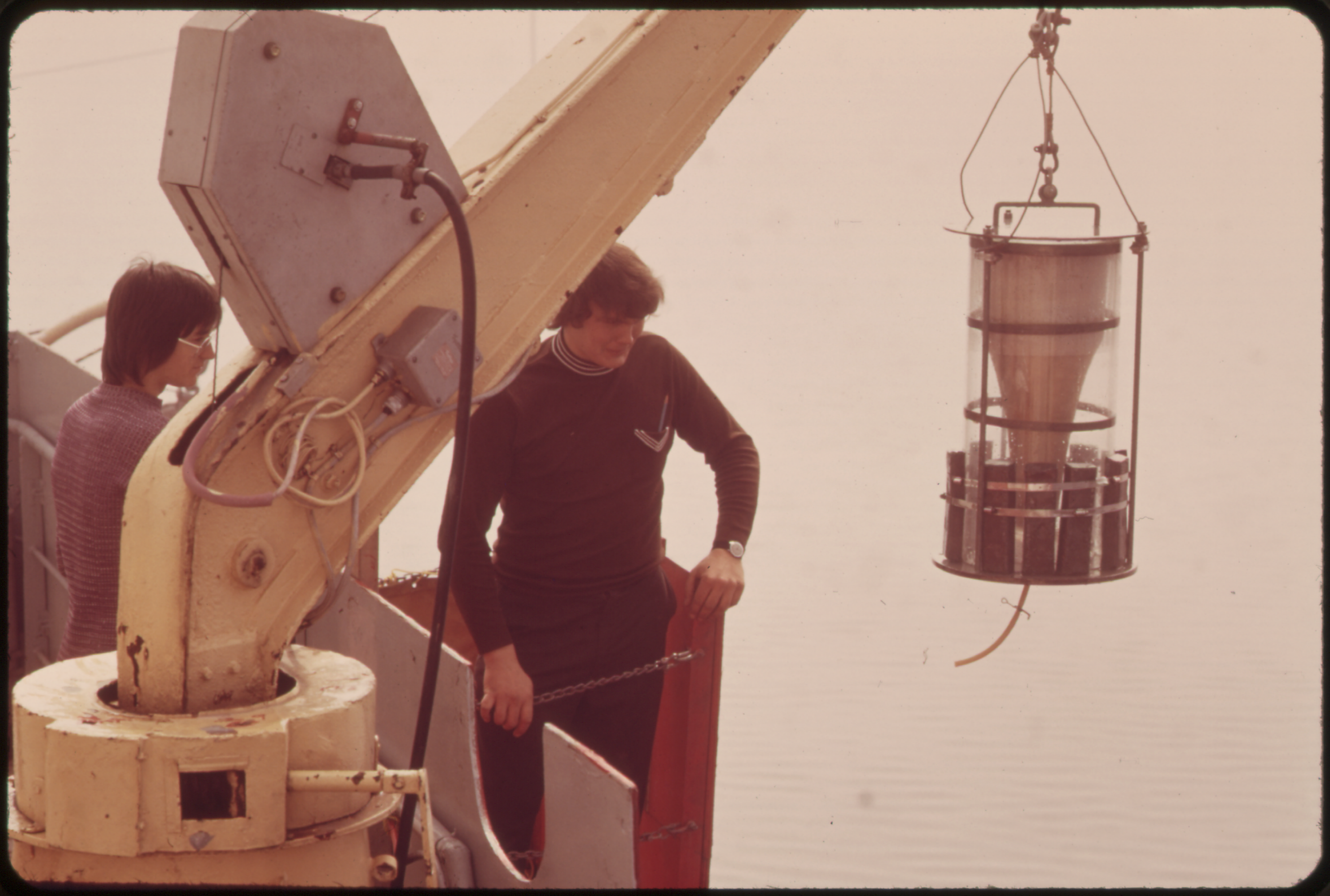
Retrieving a plankton sample

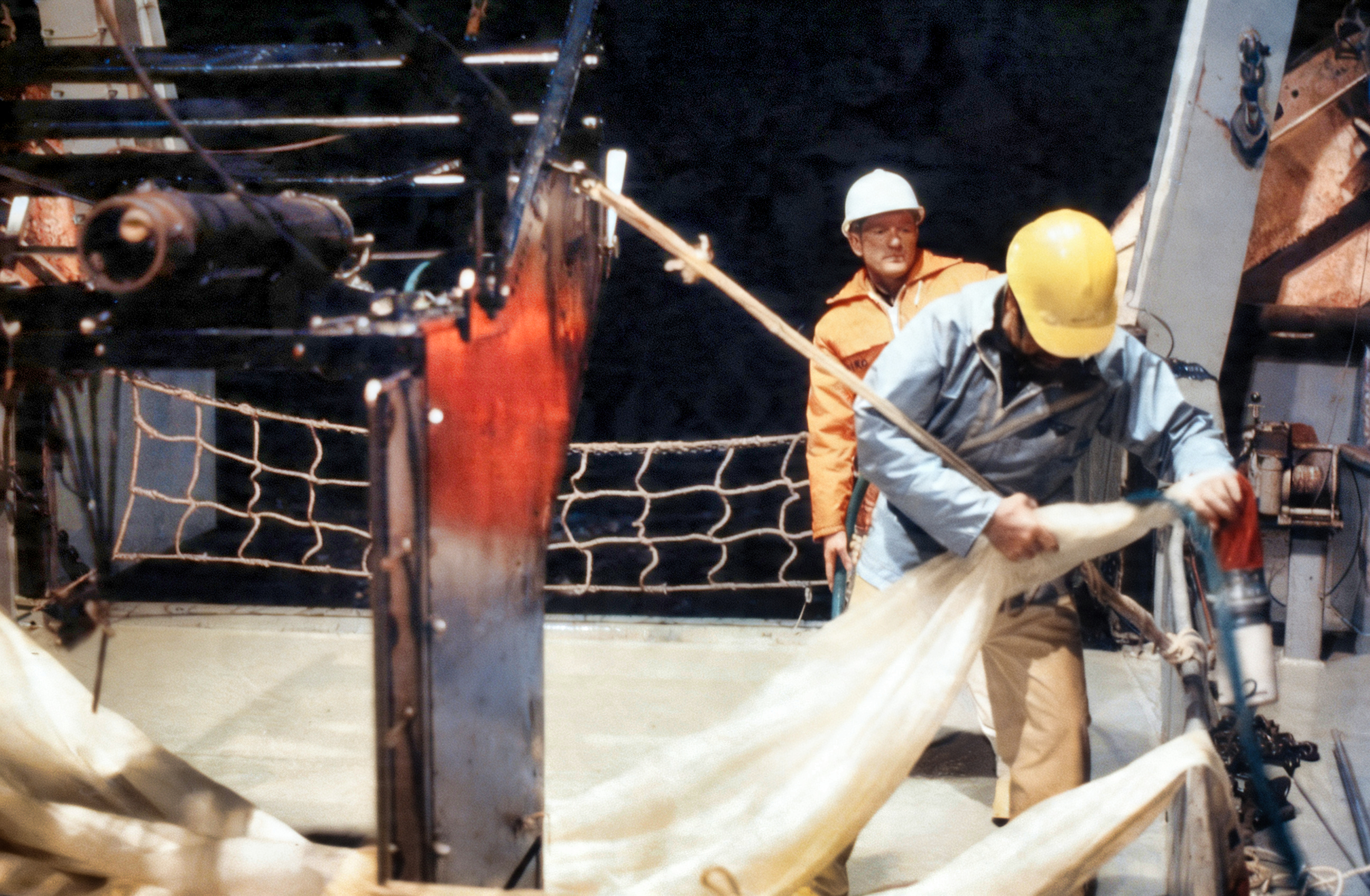
EZ net (BIONESS) night-time net retrieval

== Taxonomic groups ==
=== Protozooplankton ===
Protozooplankton refers to protist zooplankton (planktonic protozoans). All protozooplankton are protozoans, but not all protozoans are protozooplankton, since some live in environments like soil or as parasites. Marine planktonic protozoans include zooflagellates, foraminiferans, radiolarians and some dinoflagellates.

Protozoans are protists that feed on organic matter such as other microorganisms or organic tissues and debris. Historically, the protozoa were regarded as "one-celled animals", because they often possess animal-like behaviours, such as motility and predation, and lack a cell wall, as found in plants and many algae. Although the traditional practice of grouping protozoa with animals is no longer considered valid, the term continues to be used in a loose way to identify single-celled organisms that can move independently and feed by heterotrophy.

==== Radiolarians ====
External videos
- Radiolarian geometry

Radiolarians are unicellular predatory protists encased in elaborate globular shells usually made of silica and pierced with holes. Their name comes from the Latin for "radius". They catch prey by extending parts of their body through the holes. As with the silica frustules of diatoms, radiolarian shells can sink to the ocean floor when radiolarians die and become preserved as part of the ocean sediment. These remains, as microfossils, provide valuable information about past oceanic conditions.

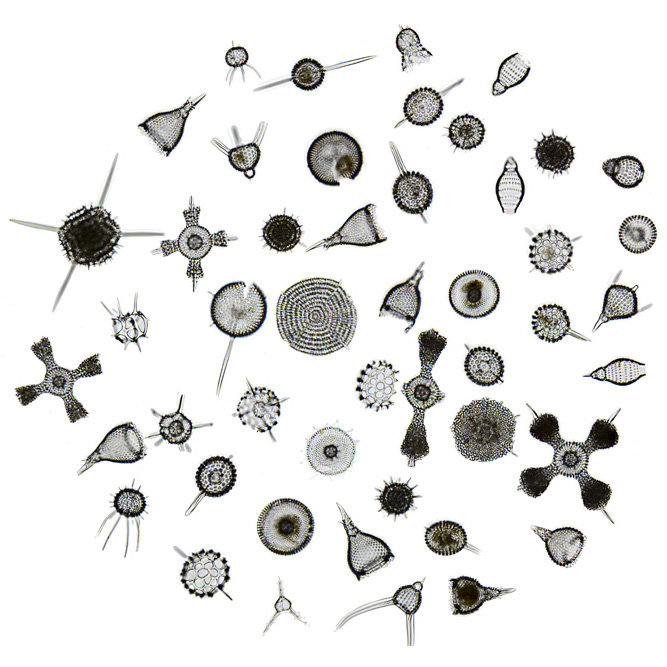
Like diatoms, radiolarians come in many shapes

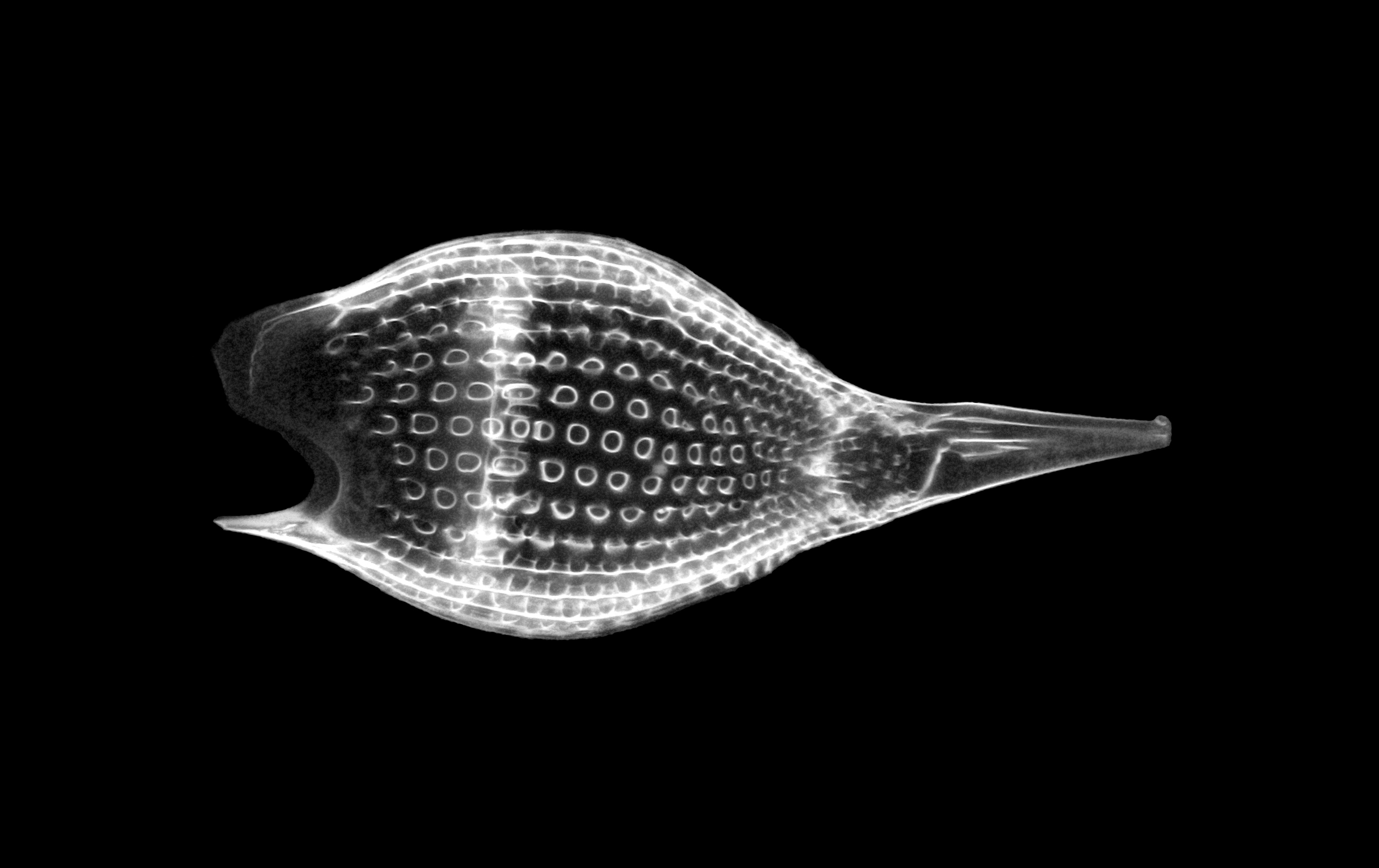
Also like diatoms, radiolarian shells are usually made of silicate

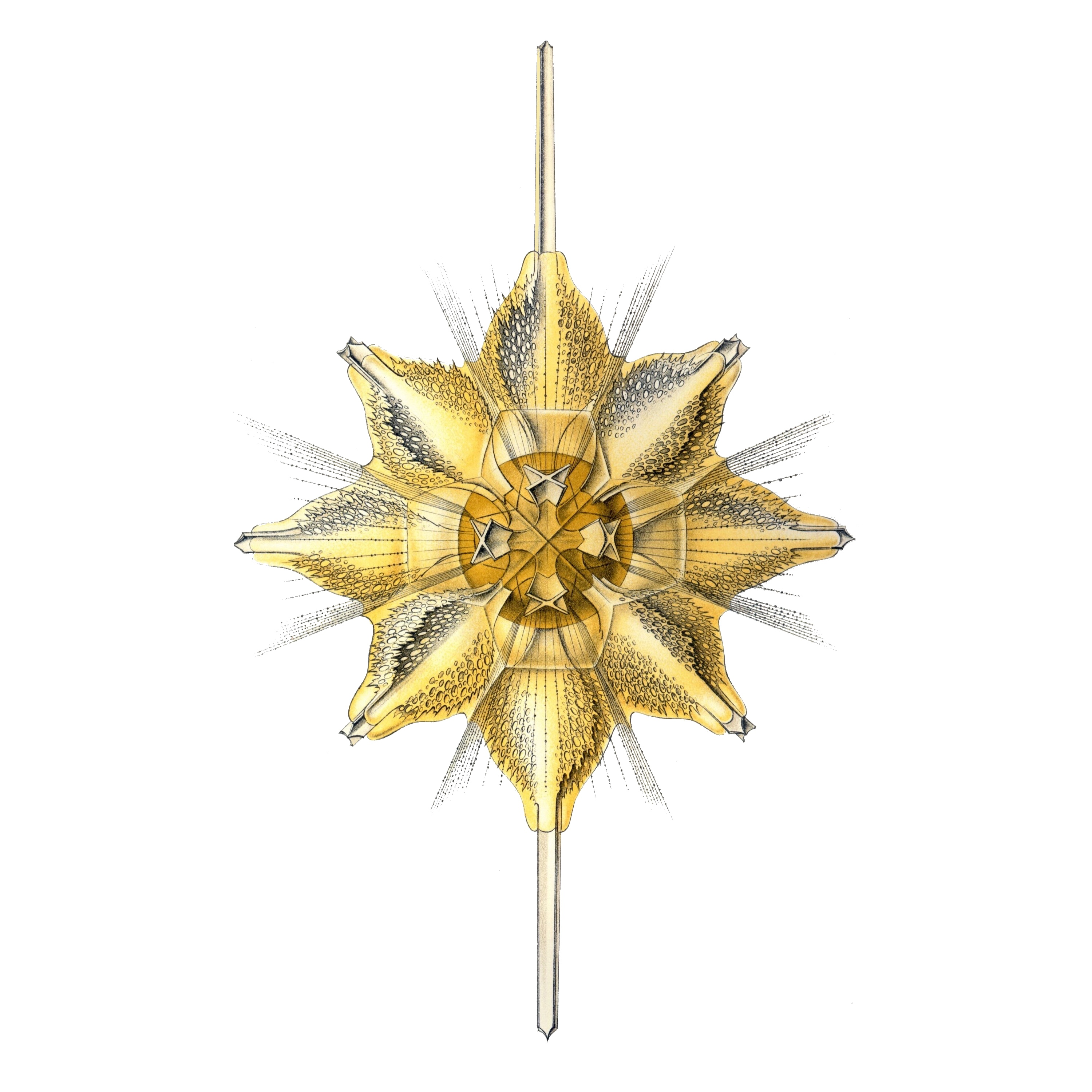
Acantharian radiolarians have shells made from strontium sulfate crystals

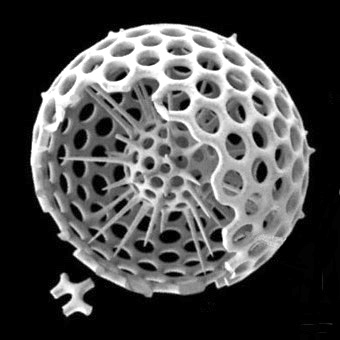
Cutaway schematic diagram of a spherical radiolarian shell

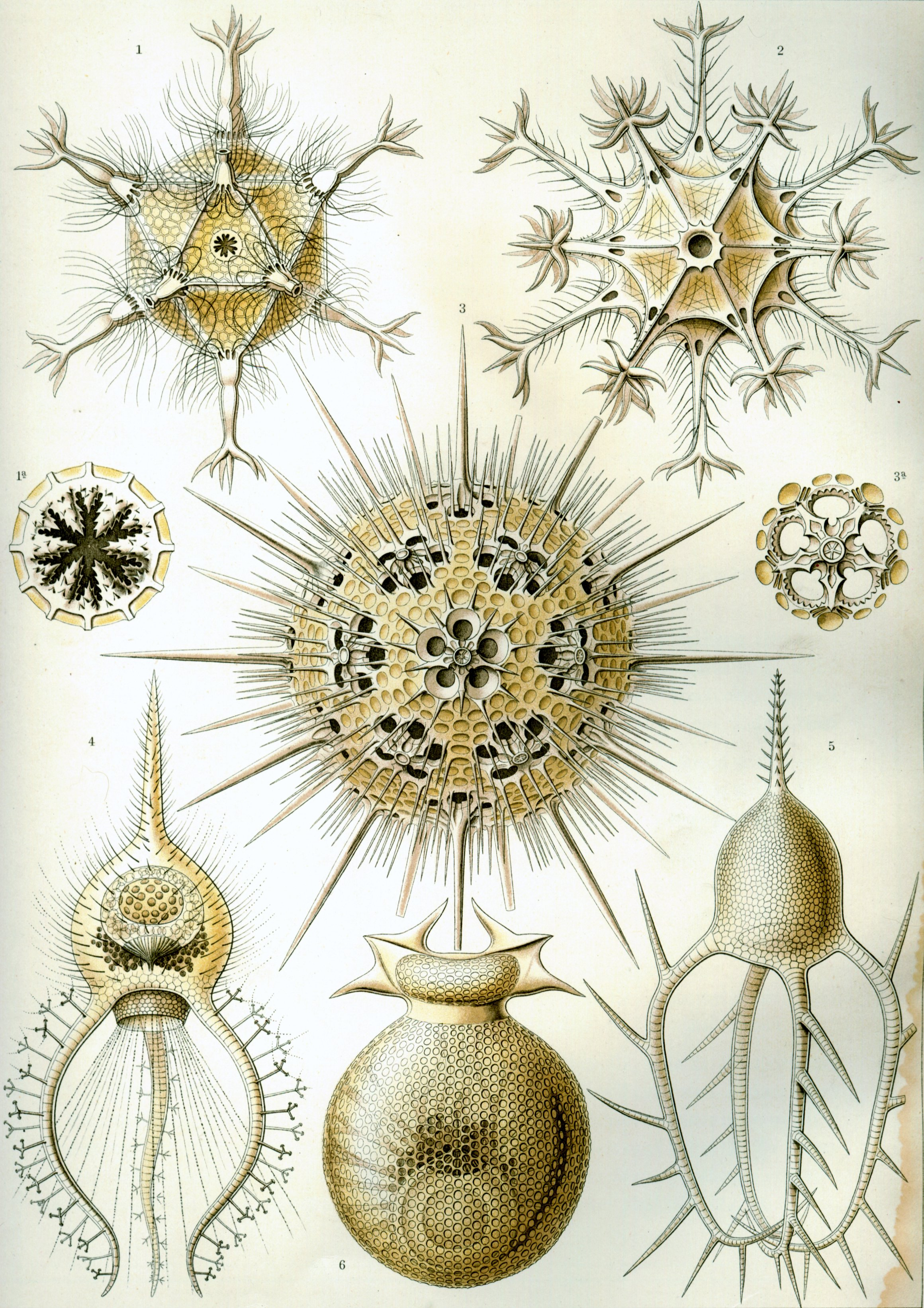
Drawings by Haeckel of Phaeodaria

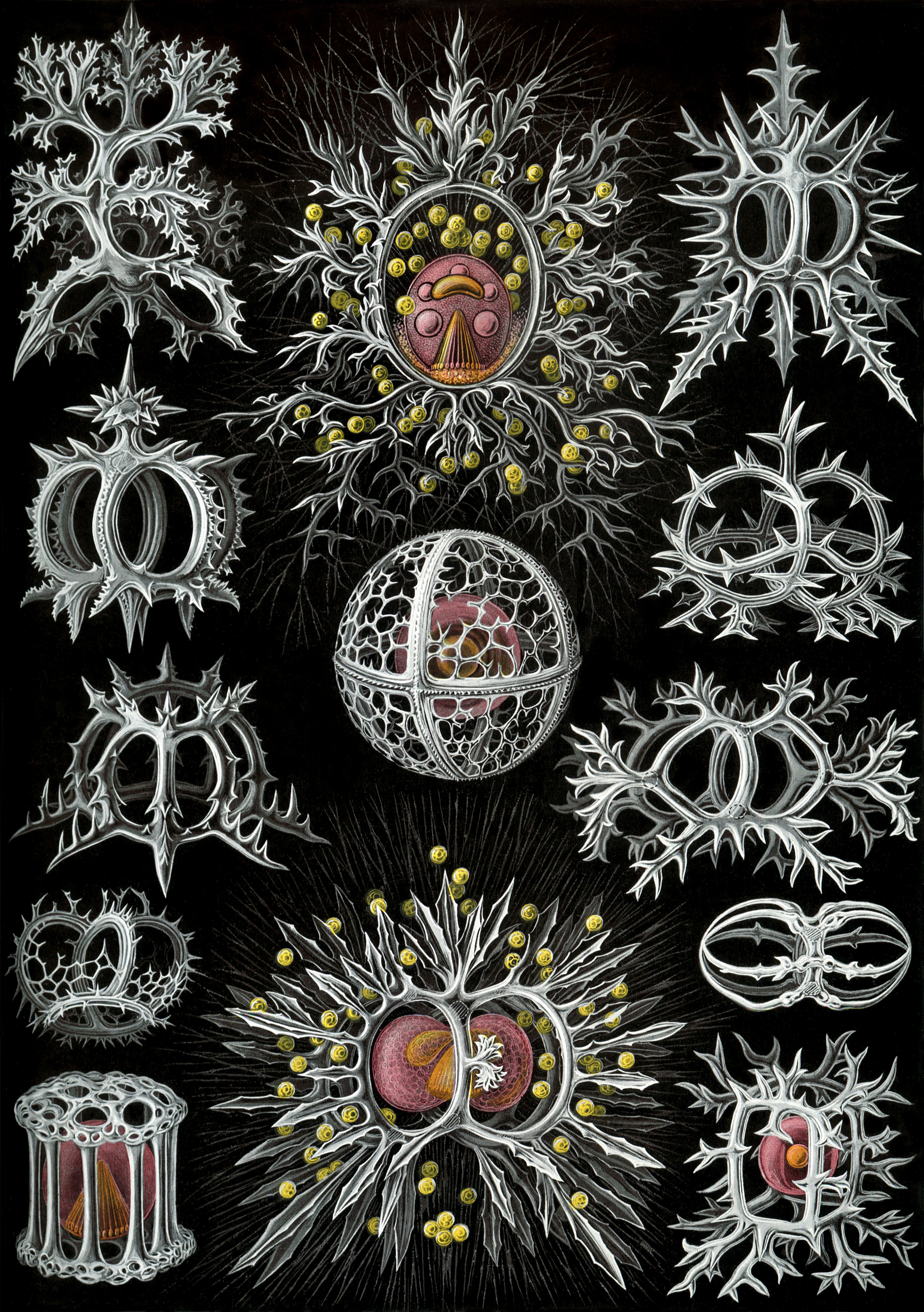
Drawings by Haeckel of Stephoidea

==== Foraminiferans ====
Like radiolarians, foraminiferans (forams for short) are single-celled predatory protists, also protected with shells that have holes in them. Their name comes from the Latin for "hole bearers". Their shells, often called tests, are chambered (forams add more chambers as they grow). The shells are usually made of calcite, but are sometimes made of agglutinated sediment particles or chiton, and (rarely) silica. Most forams are benthic, but about 40 species are planktic. They are widely researched with well-established fossil records which allow scientists to infer a lot about past environments and climates.

Foraminiferans

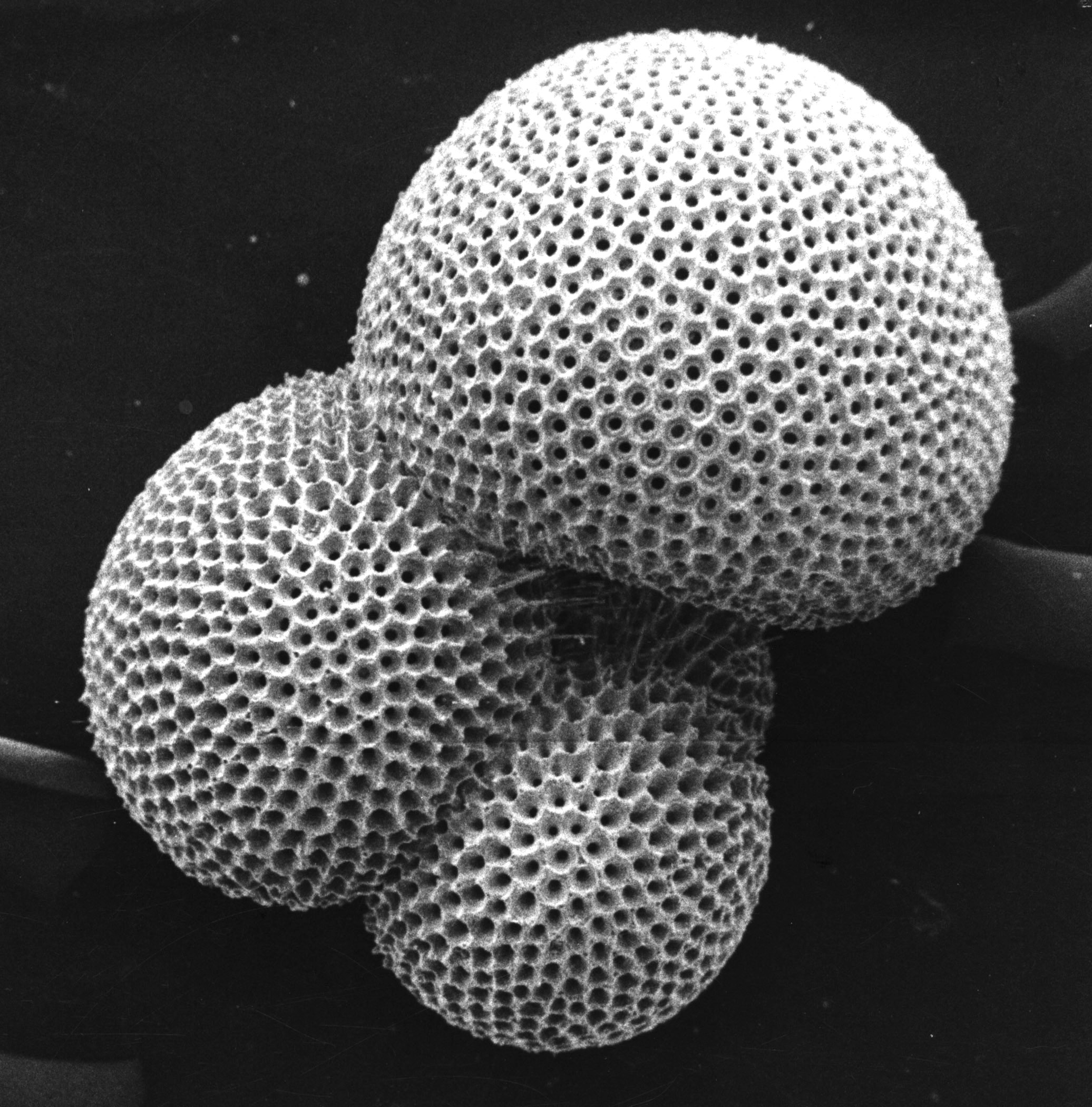
...can have more than one nucleus

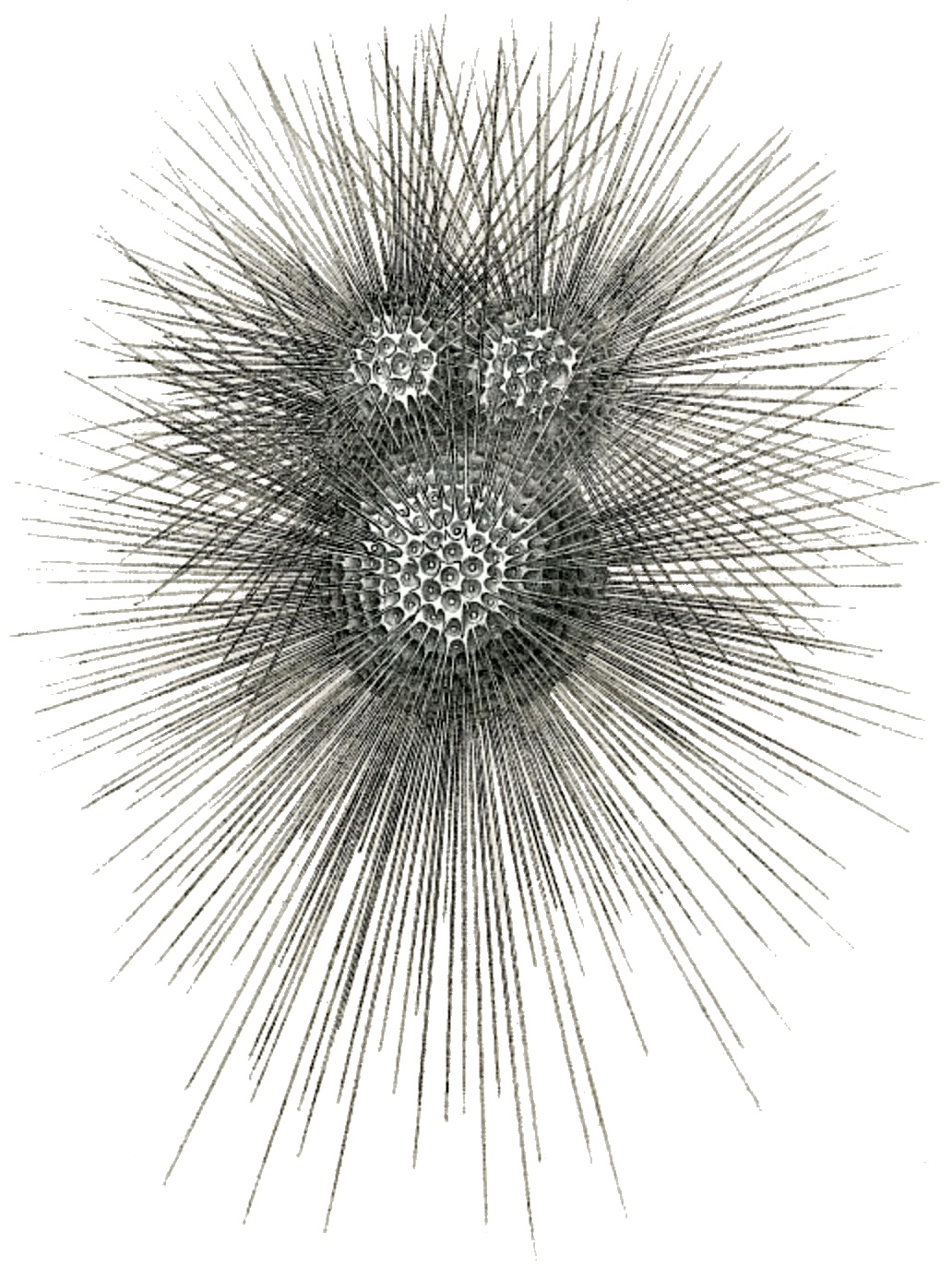
...and defensive spines

Foraminiferans are important unicellular zooplankton protists, with calcium tests
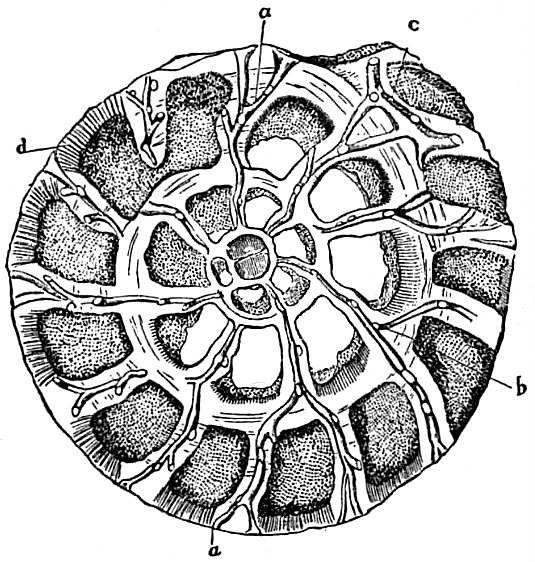
section showing chambers of a spiral foram

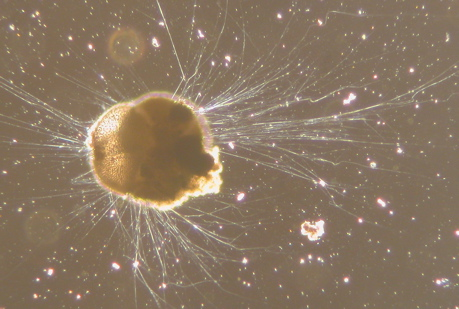
Live Ammonia tepida streaming granular ectoplasm for catching food

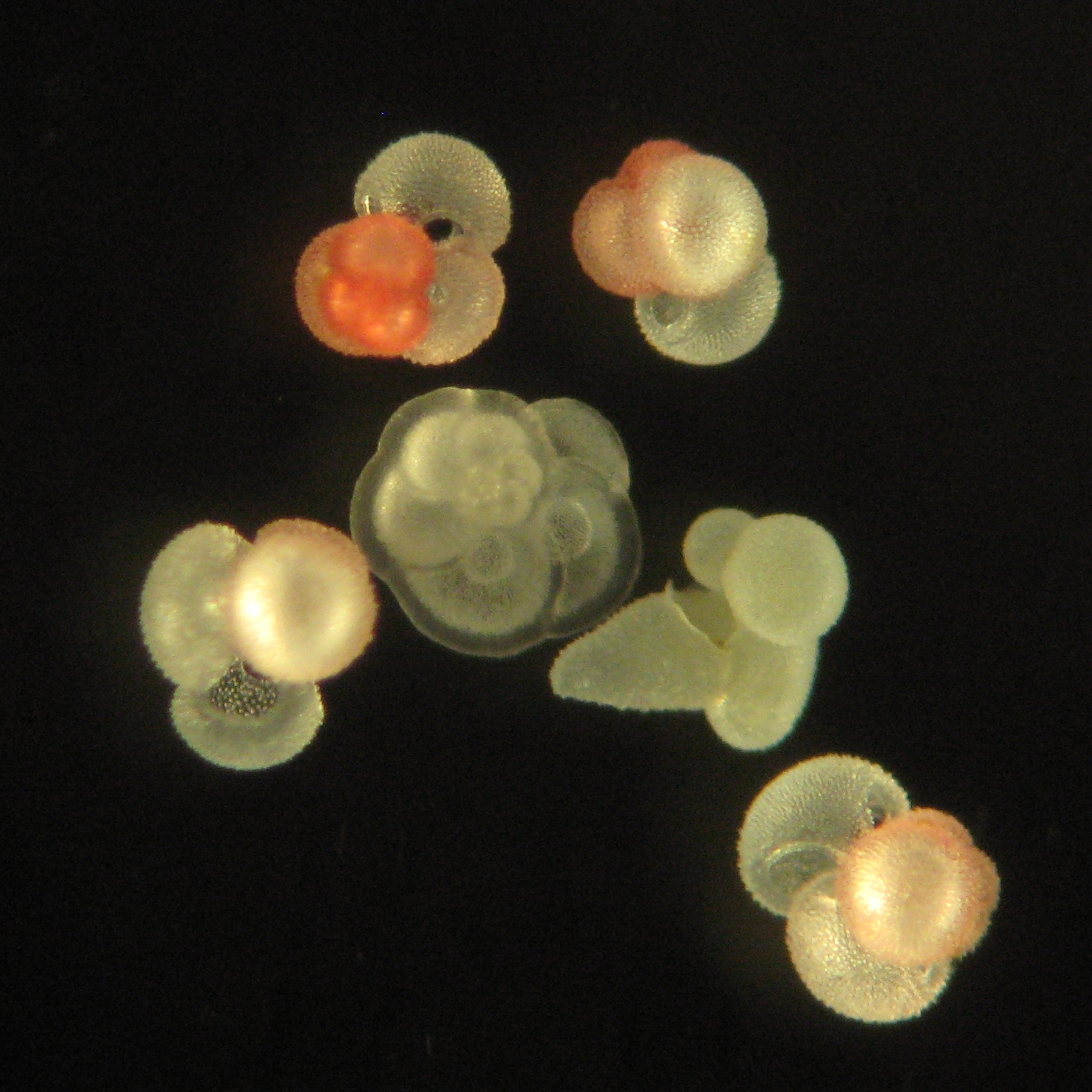
Group of planktonic forams

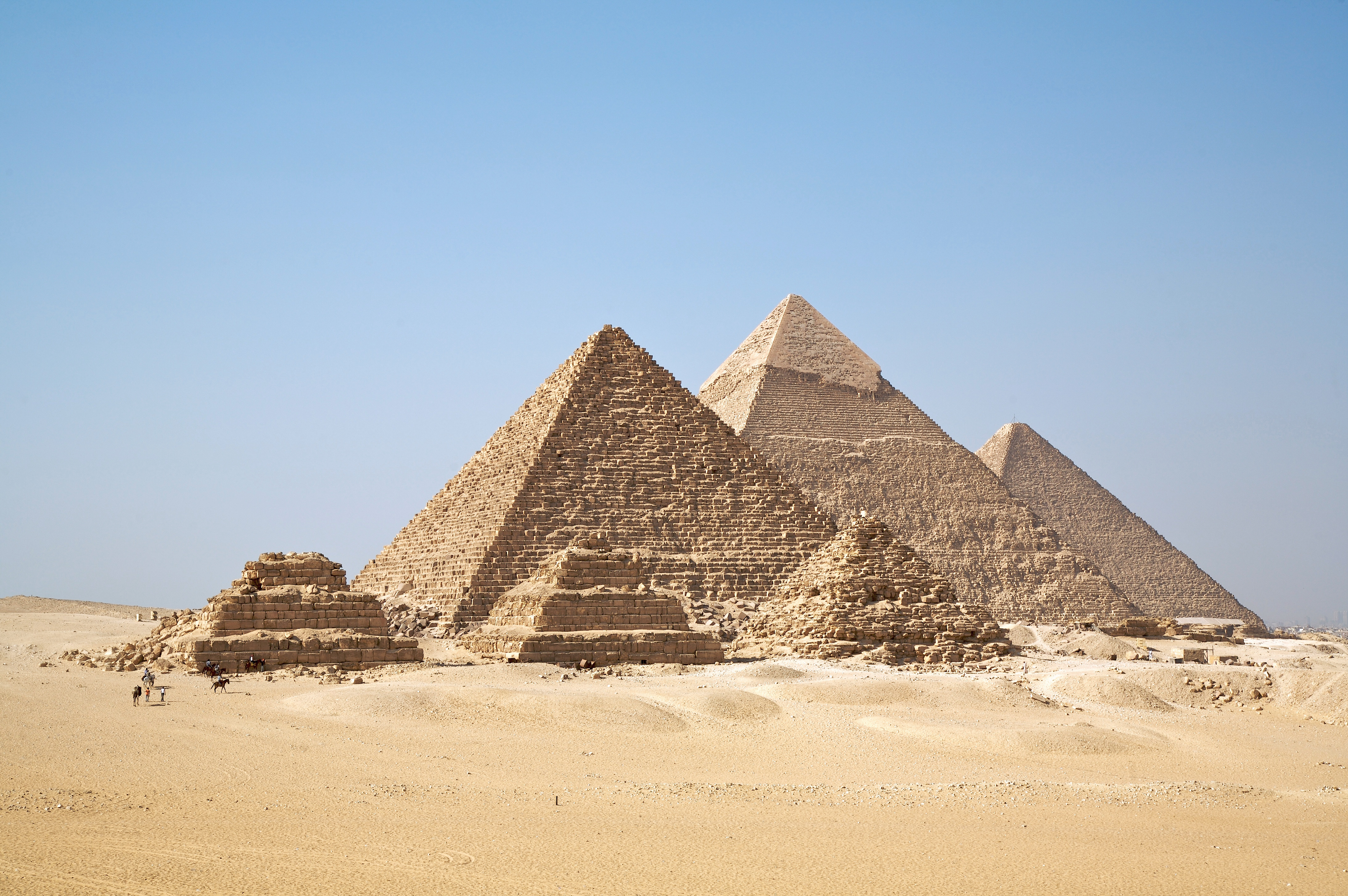
The Egyptian pyramids were constructed from limestone that contained nummulites.

External videos
- foraminiferans
- Foraminiferal networks and growth

==== Amoeba ====
Shelled and naked amoeba

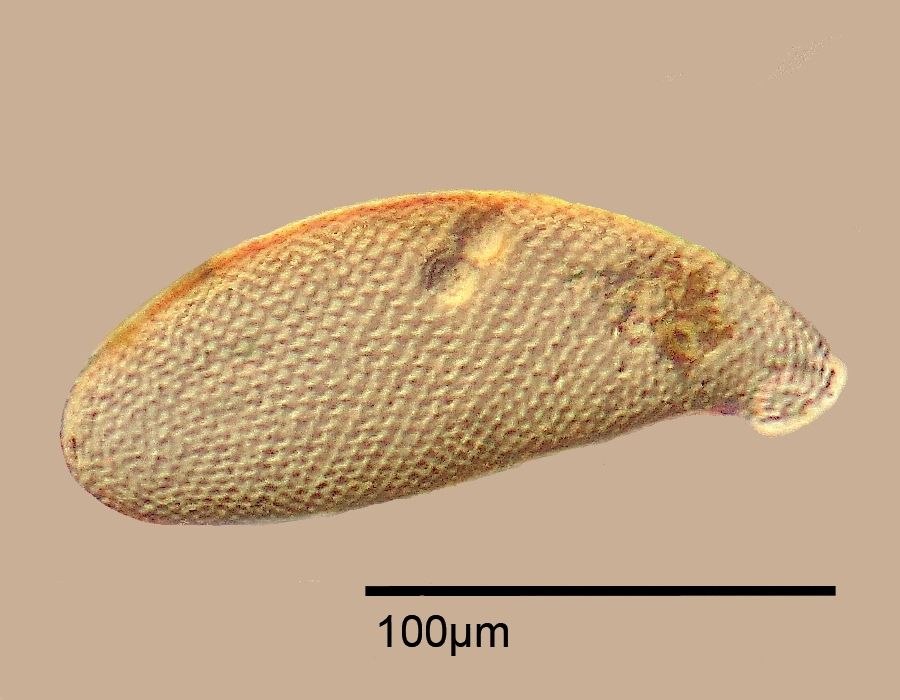
Testate amoeba, Cyphoderia sp.

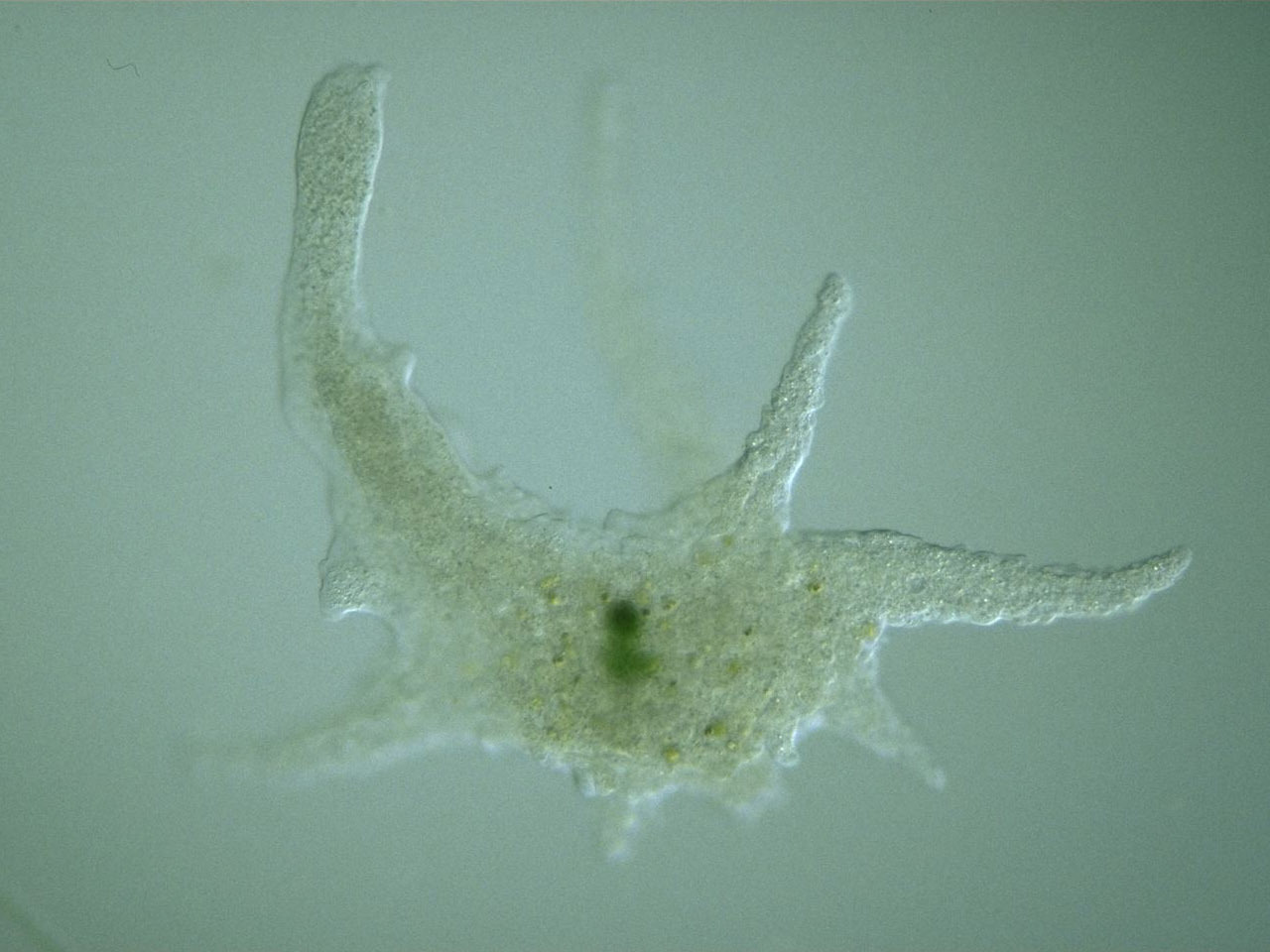
Naked amoeba, Chaos carolinensis

Amoeba can be shelled (testate) or naked
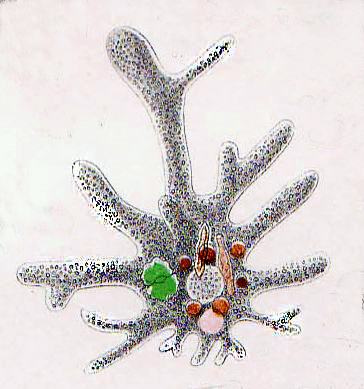
Naked amoeba sketch showing food vacuoles and ingested diatom

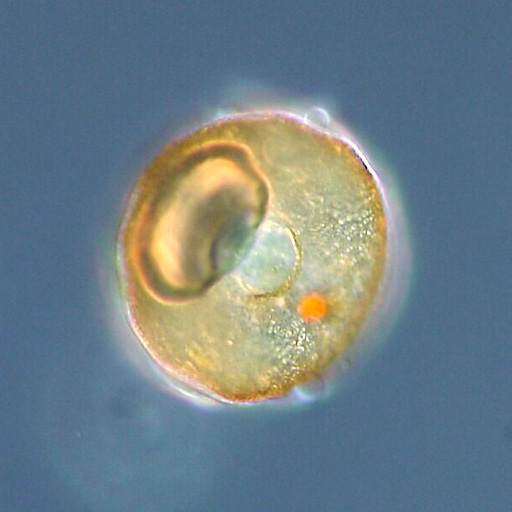
Shell or test of a testate amoeba, Arcella sp.

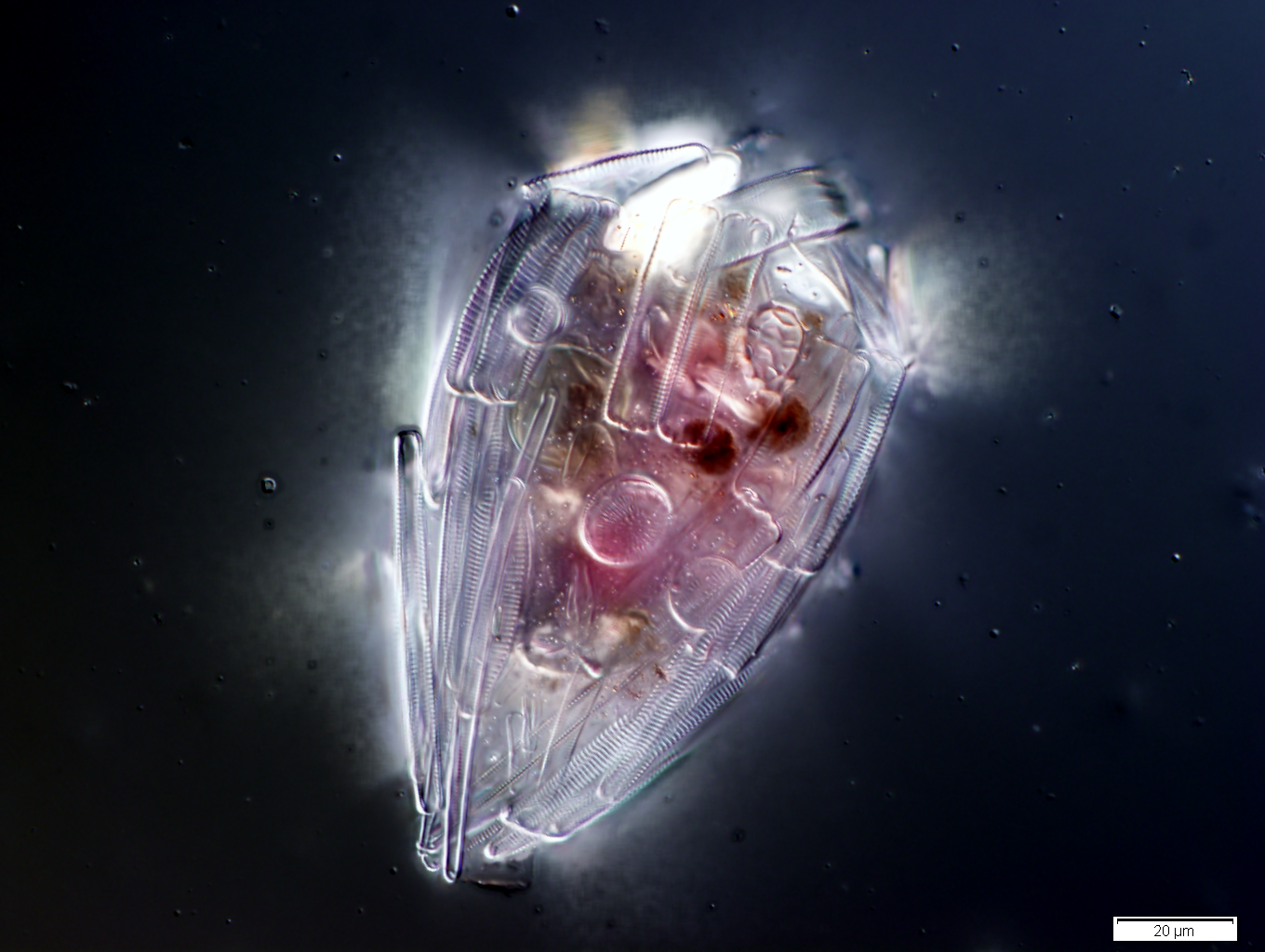
Xenogenic testate amoeba covered in diatoms

==== Ciliates ====
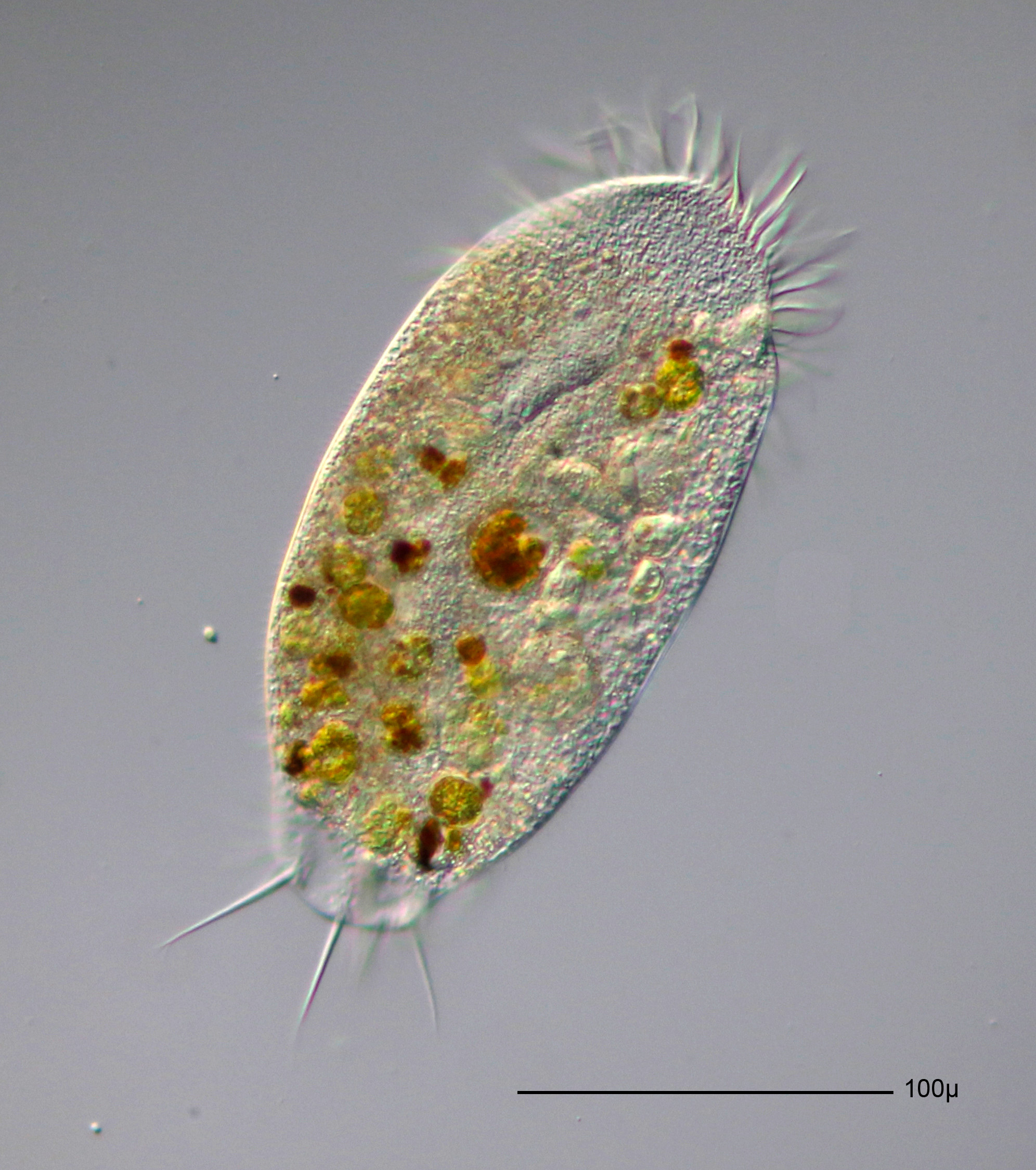
Stylonychia putrina

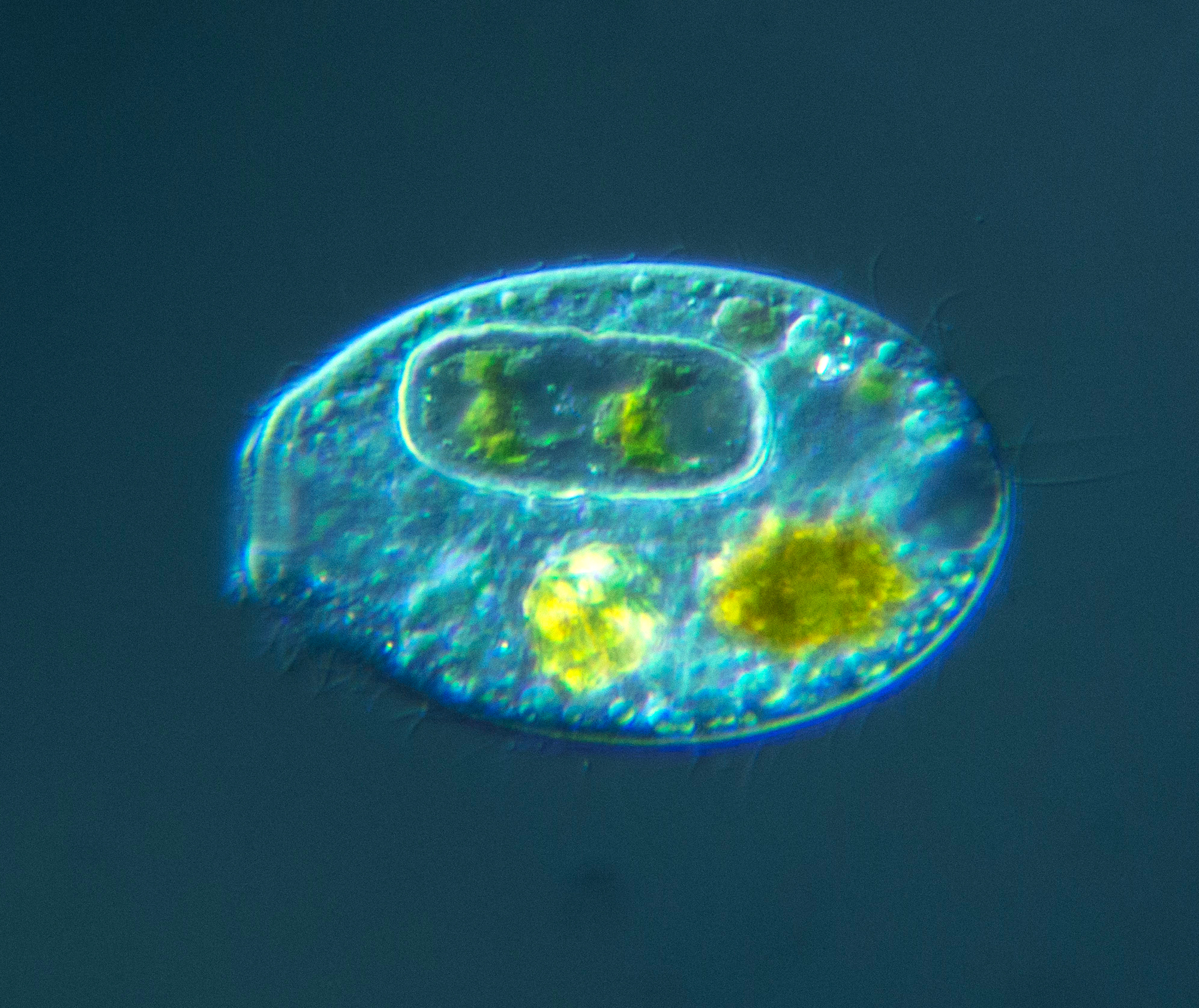
Holophyra ovum

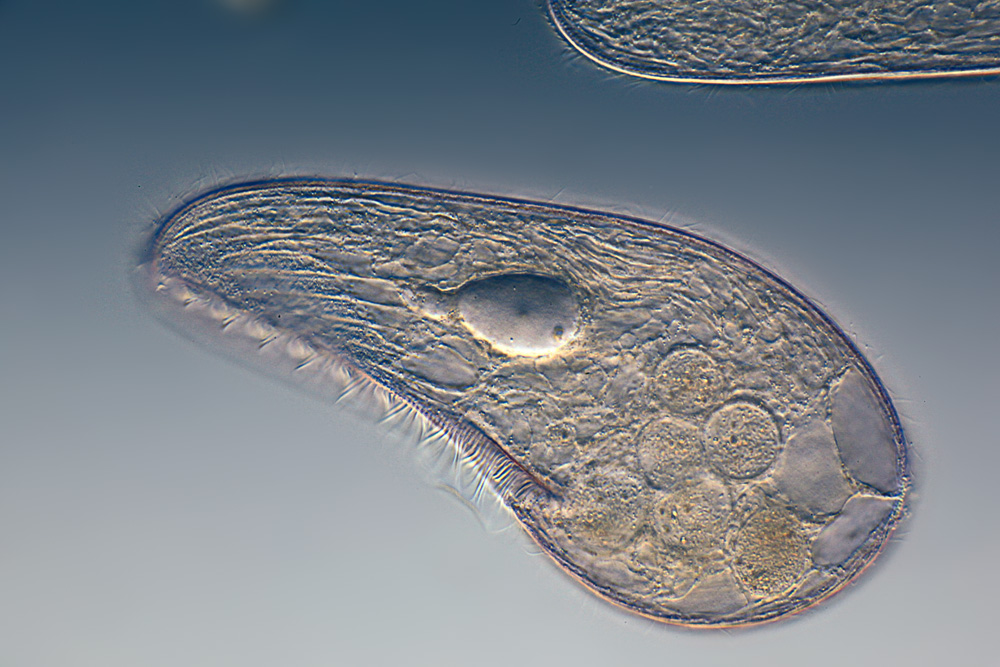
Blepharisma japonicum

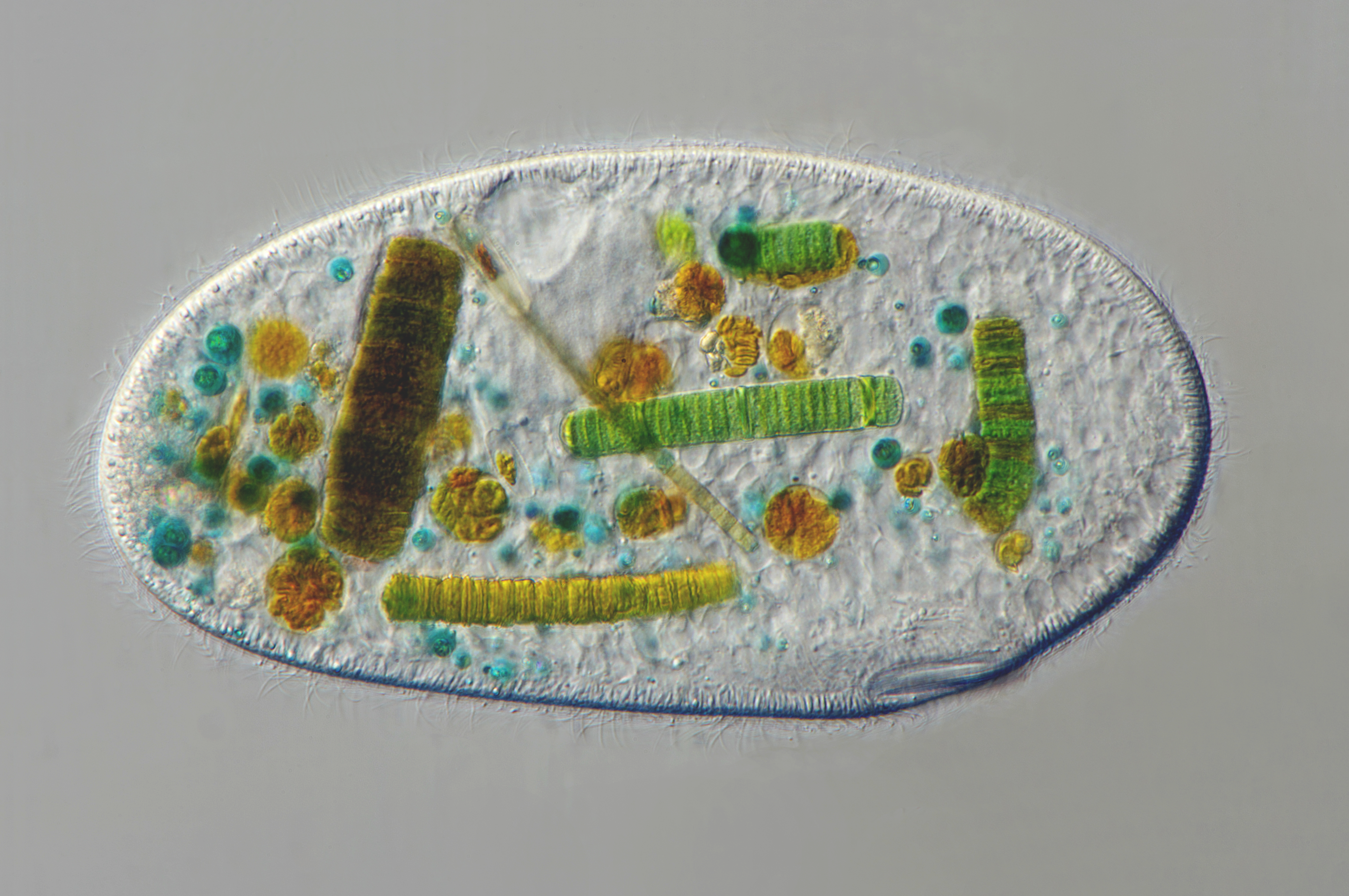
This ciliate is digesting cyanobacteria. The mouth is at the bottom right.

==== Dinoflagellates ====
Dinoflagellates are a phylum of unicellular flagellates with about 2,000 marine species. Some dinoflagellates are predatory, and thus belong to the zooplankton community. Their name comes from the Greek "dinos" meaning whirling and the Latin "flagellum" meaning a whip or lash. This refers to the two whip-like attachments (flagella) used for forward movement. Most dinoflagellates are protected with red-brown, cellulose armour. Excavates may be the most basal flagellate lineage.

Dinoflagellates

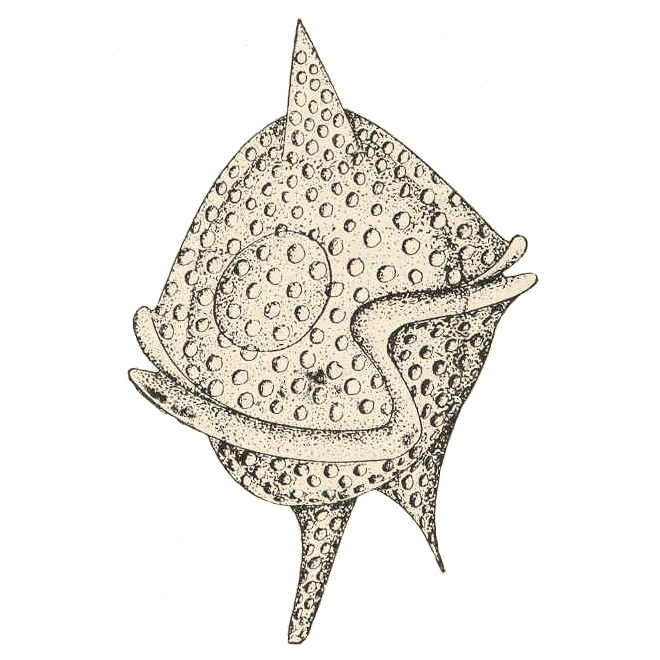
Armoured

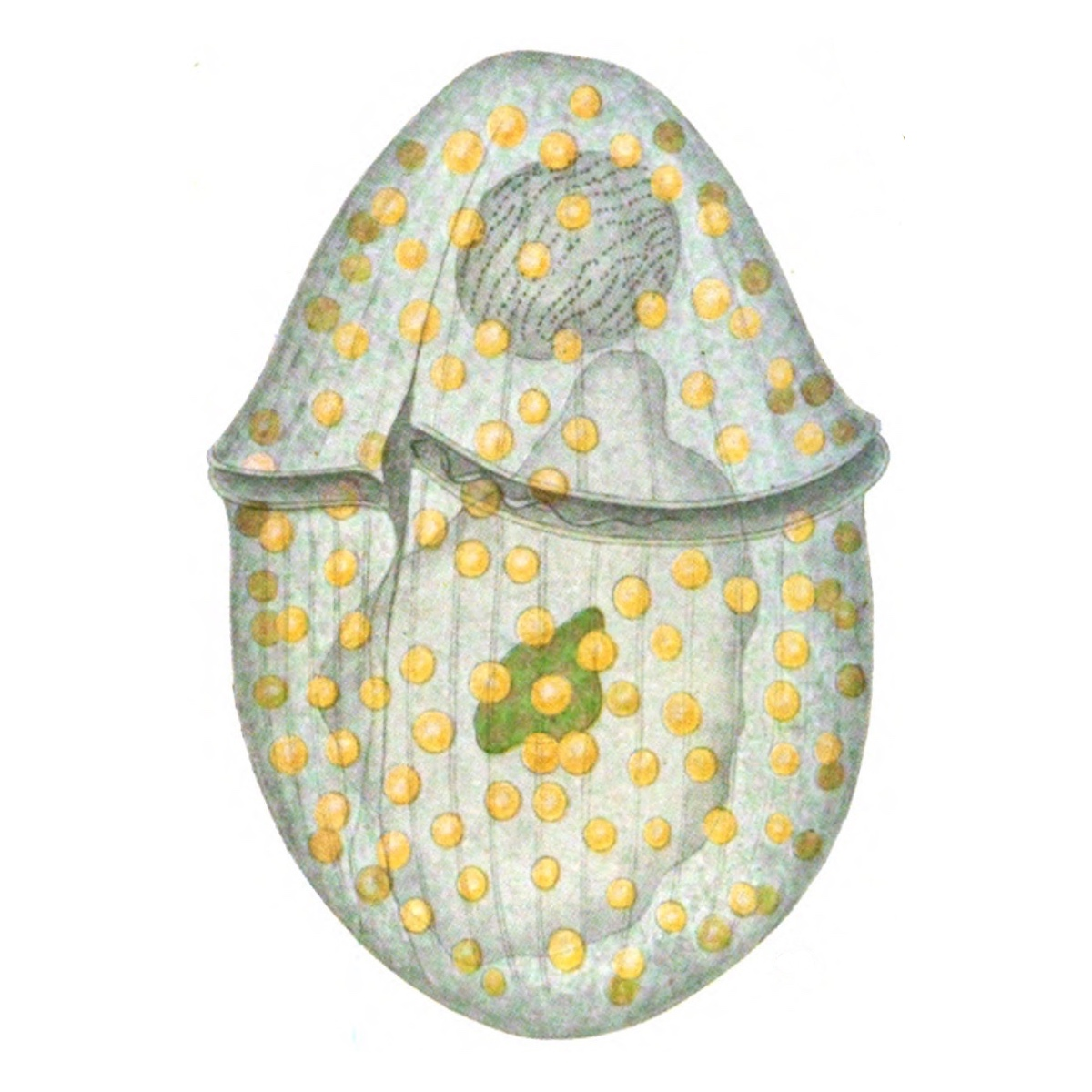
Unarmoured

Traditionally dinoflagellates have been presented as armoured or unarmoured
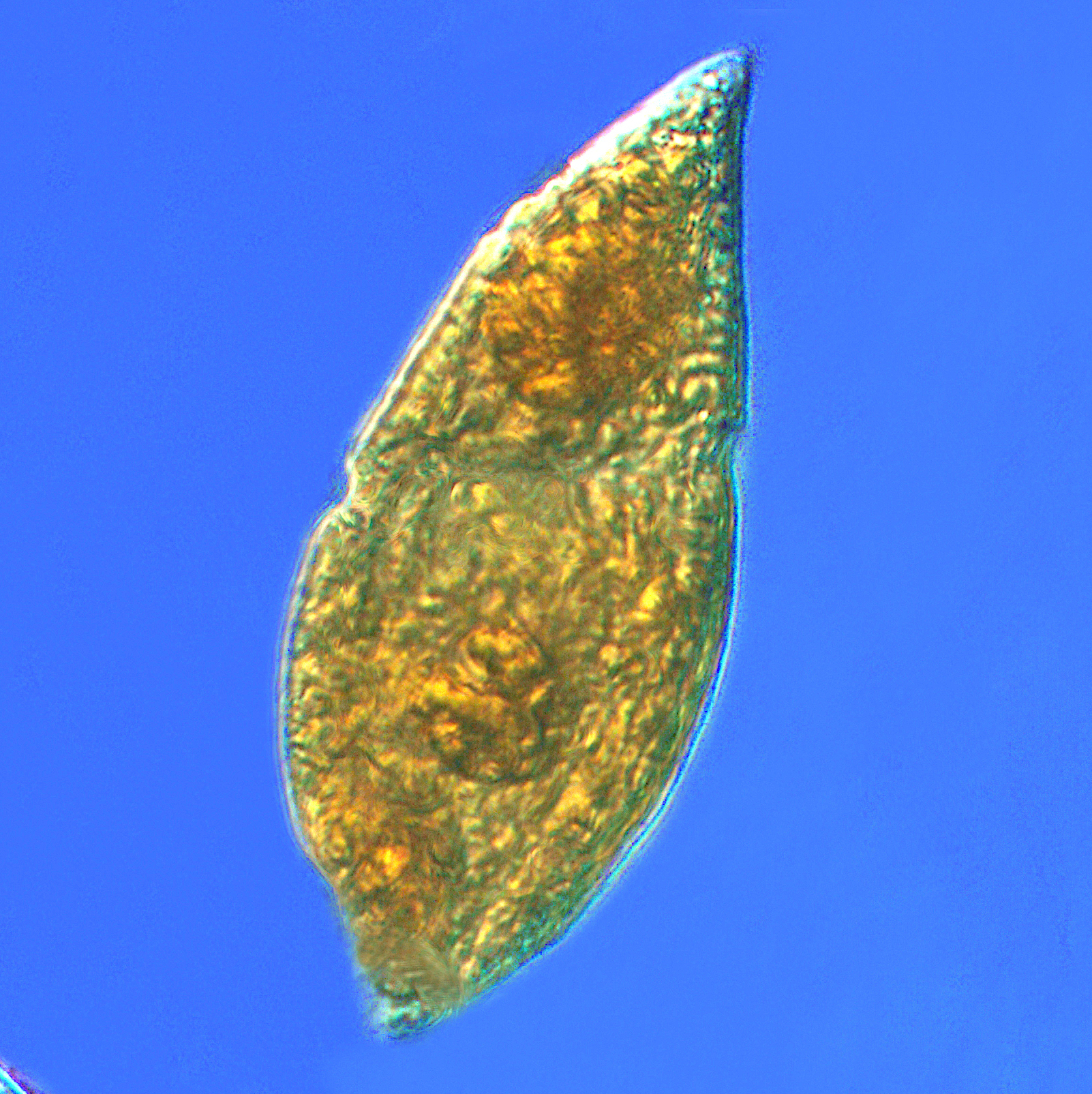
Gyrodinium, one of the few naked dinoflagellates which lack armour

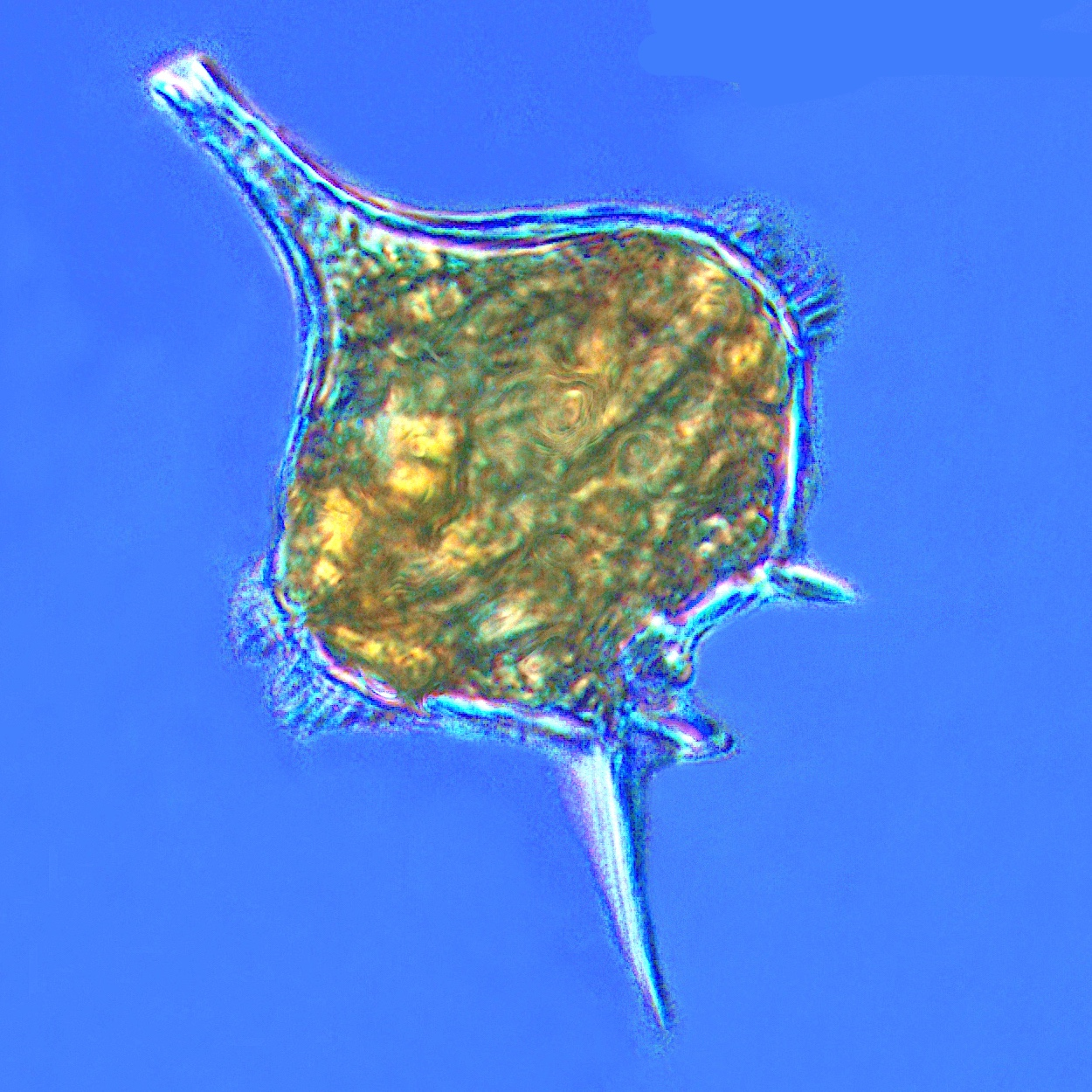
The dinoflagellate Protoperidinium extrudes a large feeding veil to capture prey

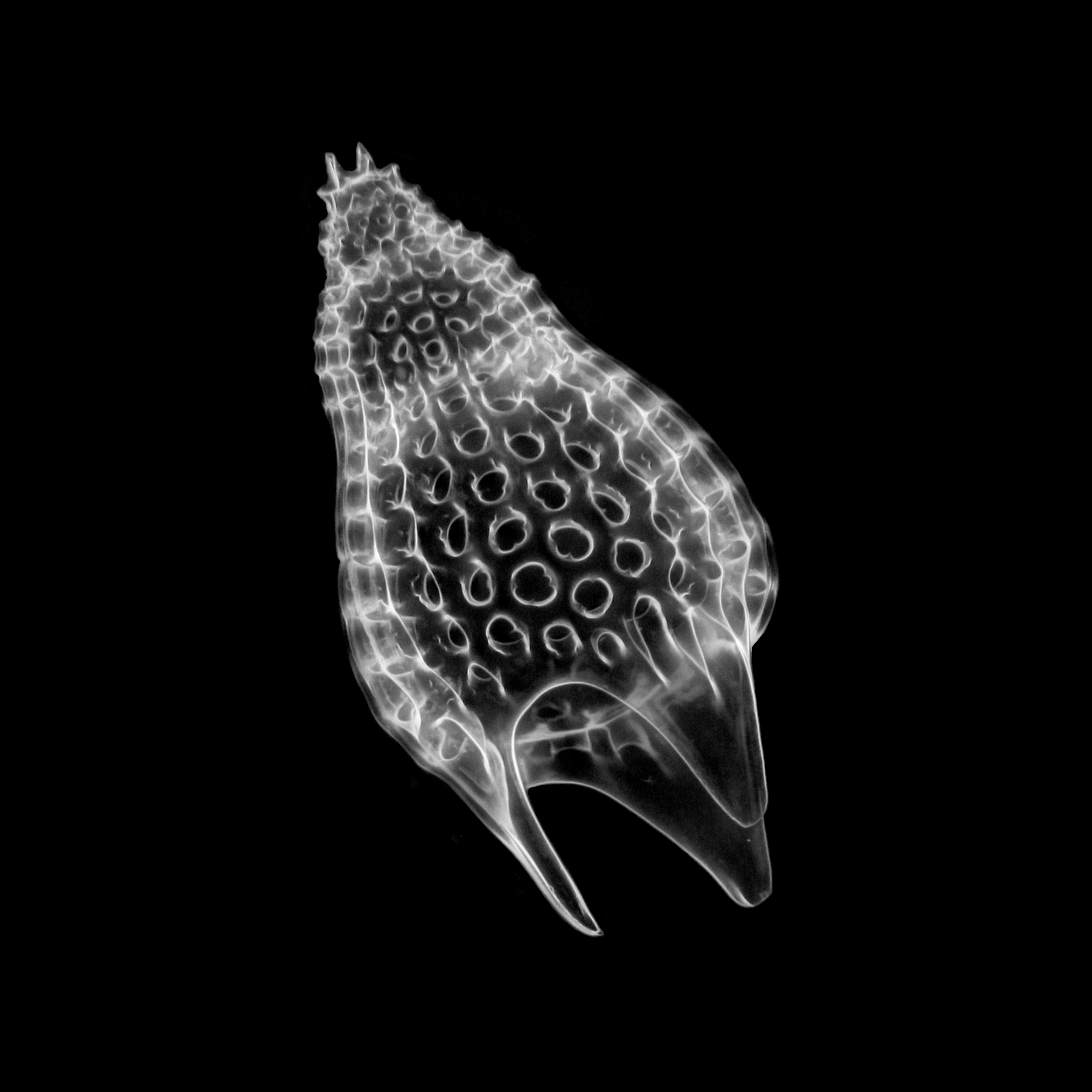
Nassellarian radiolarians can be in symbiosis with dinoflagellates

Dinoflagellates often live in symbiosis with other organisms. Many nassellarian radiolarians house dinoflagellate symbionts within their tests. The nassellarian provides ammonium and carbon dioxide for the dinoflagellate, while the dinoflagellate provides the nassellarian with a mucous membrane useful for hunting and protection against harmful invaders. There is evidence from DNA analysis that dinoflagellate symbiosis with radiolarians evolved independently from other dinoflagellate symbioses, such as with foraminifera.

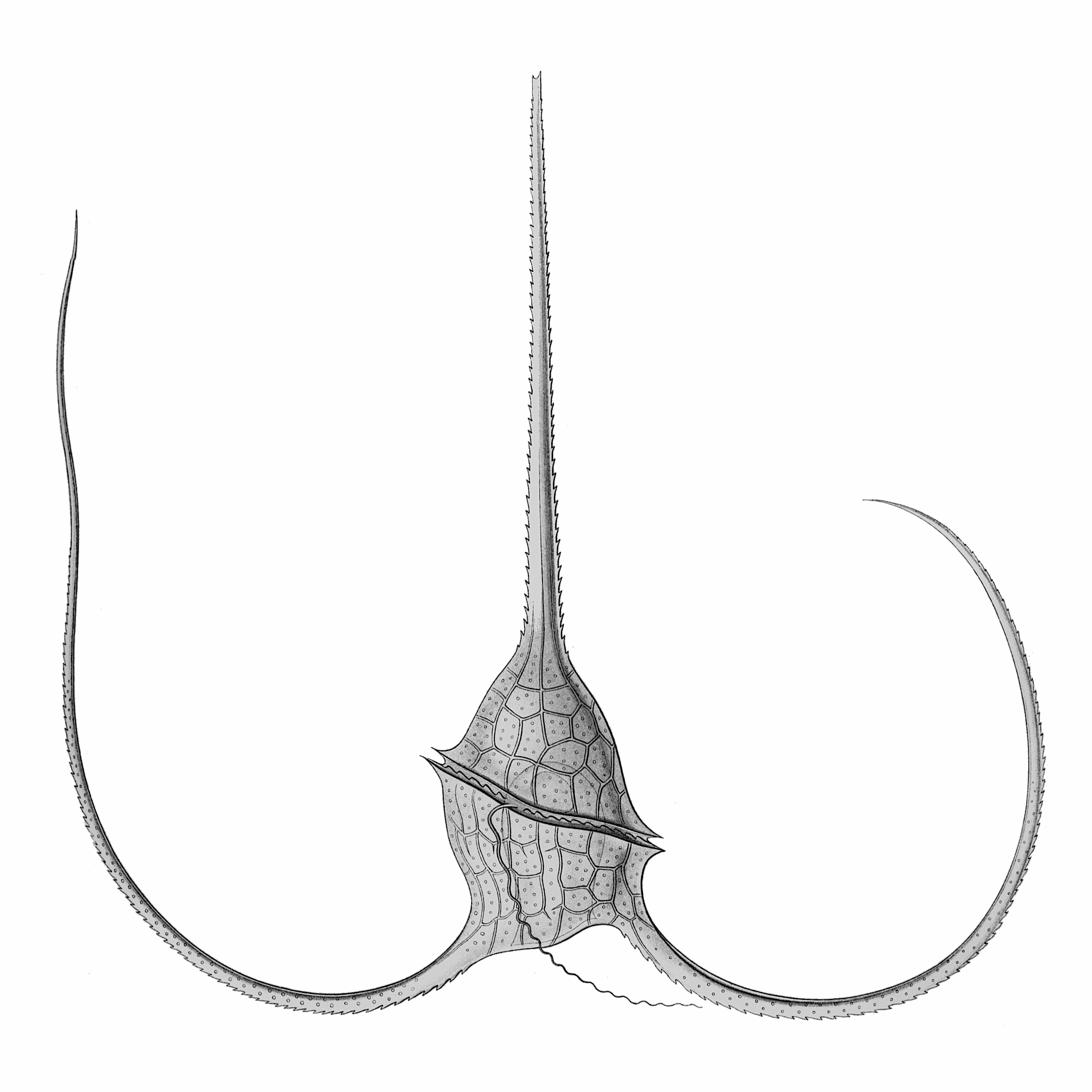
Tripos muelleri is recognisable by its U-shaped horns

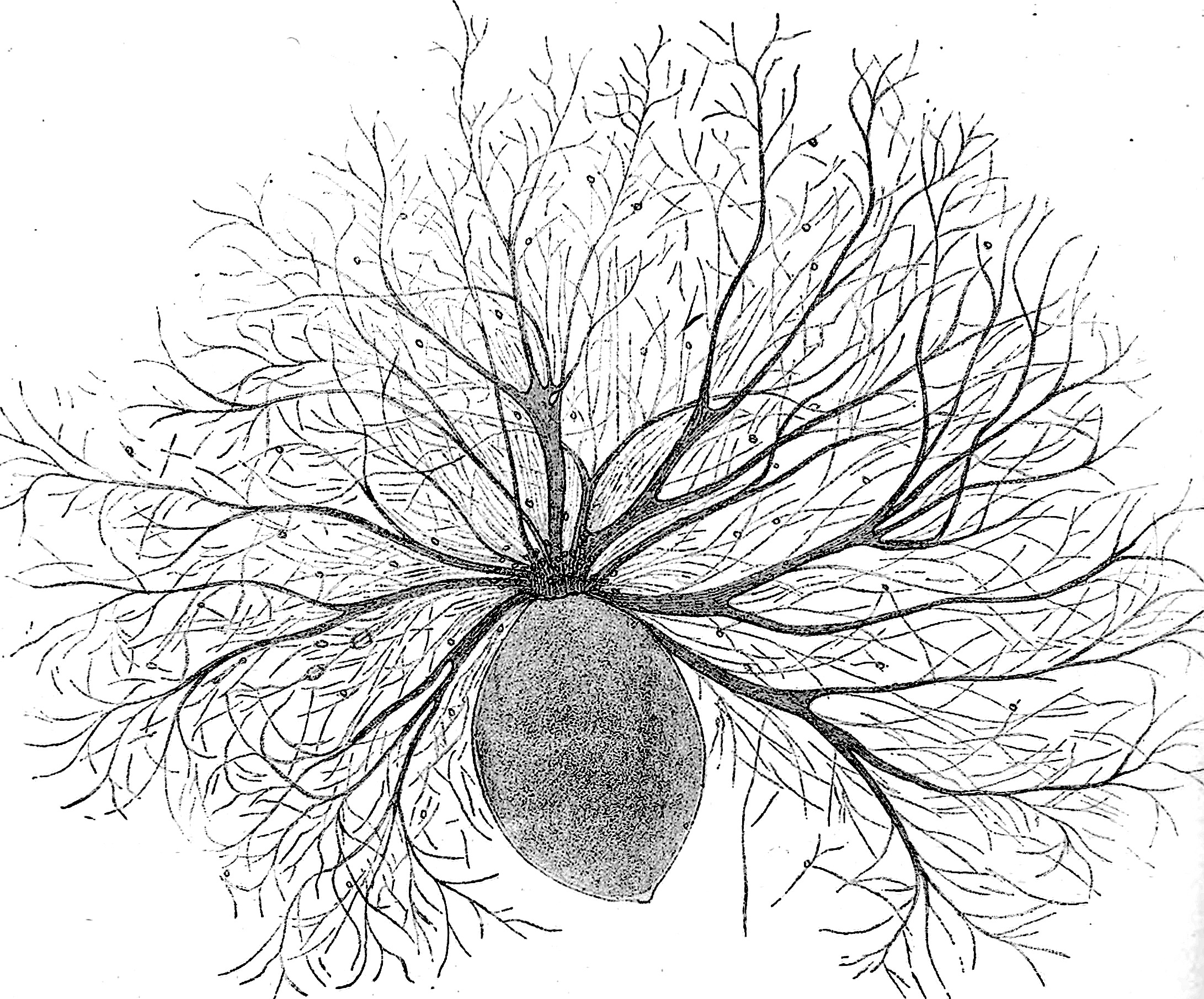
Oodinium, a genus of parasitic dinoflagellates, causes velvet disease in fish

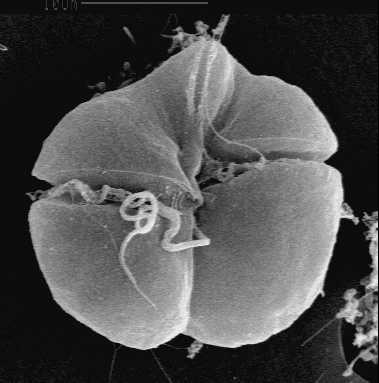
Karenia brevis produces red tides highly toxic to humans

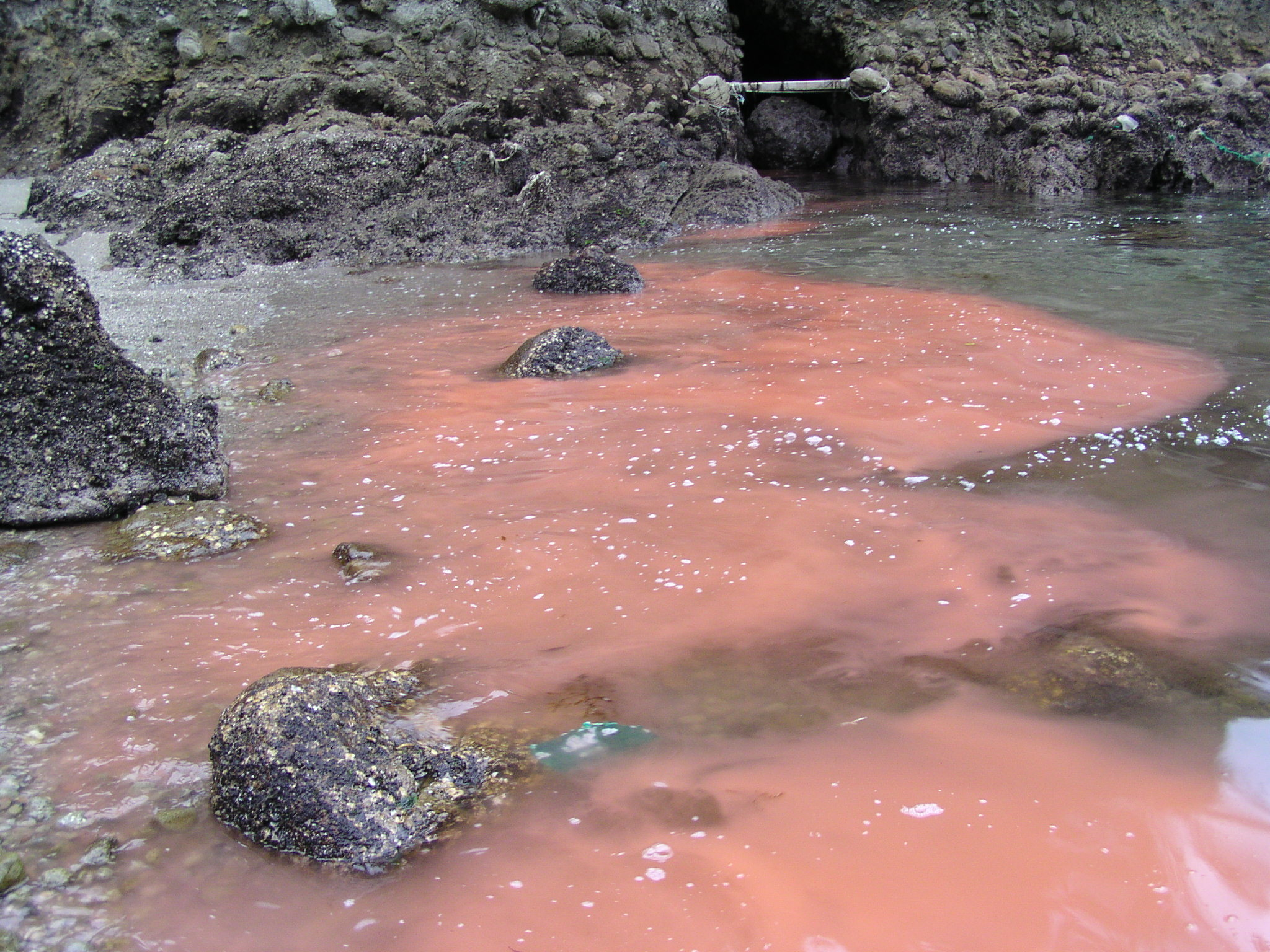
Red tide

=== Mixoplankton ===
Mixoplankton are mixotrophic plankton, capable of both photosynthesis and predation. A mixotroph is an organism that can use a mix of different sources of energy and carbon, instead of having a single trophic mode on the continuum from complete autotrophy at one end to heterotrophy at the other. It is estimated that mixotrophs comprise more than half of all microscopic plankton. There are two types of eukaryotic mixotrophs: those with their own chloroplasts, and those with endosymbionts—and others that acquire them through kleptoplasty or by enslaving the entire phototrophic cell.

The distinction between plants and animals often breaks down in very small organisms. Possible combinations are photo- and chemotrophy, litho- and organotrophy, auto- and heterotrophy or other combinations of these. Mixotrophs can be either eukaryotic or prokaryotic. They can take advantage of different environmental conditions.

Many marine microzooplankton are mixotrophic, which means they could also be classified as phytoplankton. Recent studies of marine microzooplankton found 30–45% of the ciliate abundance was mixotrophic, and up to 65% of the amoeboid, foram and radiolarian biomass was mixotrophic.

Mixotrophic zooplankton that combine phototrophy and heterotrophy – table based on Stoecker et al., 2017
| Description | | Example | Further examples |
|---|---|---|---|
The term nonconstitutive mixotrophs was defined by Mitra et al. in 2016), and refers to zooplankton capable of photosynthesis. These include microzooplankton or metazoan zooplankton that gain phototrophic abilities by retaining chloroplasts^{∆} (often through kleptoplasty) acquired from ingested algal prey or by maintaining photosynthetic endosymbiotic algae within their cells. They are photosynthetic zooplankton that do not inherently possess any genetic machinery for photosynthesis but acquire it secondarily from their prey or symbionts. This contrasts with constitutive mixotrophs, which have their own built-in photosynthetic capabilities.
| Generalists | Protists that sequester chloroplasts (occasionally alternate organelles) from a diverse array of algal species | | Most oligotrich ciliates with plastid retention ^{∆} |
| Specialists | 1. Protists that sequester chloroplasts (occasionally alternate organelles) either from a single algal species or from several strongly related strains | Dinophysis acuminata | Dinophysis spp. Myrionecta rubra |
| Specialists | 2. Protists or zooplankton that maintain endosymbiosis by hosting either a single algal species or several closely related strains as their internal photosynthetic partners | Noctiluca scintillans | Metazooplankton with algal endosymbionts Most mixotrophic Rhizaria (Acantharea, Polycystinea, and Foraminifera); Green Noctiluca scintillans |
^{∆} Chloroplast (or plastid) retention = sequestration = enslavement. Some plastid-retaining species also retain other organelles and prey cytoplasm.

Phaeocystis species are endosymbionts to acantharian radiolarians. Phaeocystis is an important algal genus found as part of the marine phytoplankton around the world. It has a polymorphic life cycle, ranging from free-living cells to large colonies. It has the ability to form floating colonies, where hundreds of cells are embedded in a gel matrix, which can increase massively in size during blooms. As a result, Phaeocystis is an important contributor to the marine carbon and sulfur cycles.

Mixoplankton

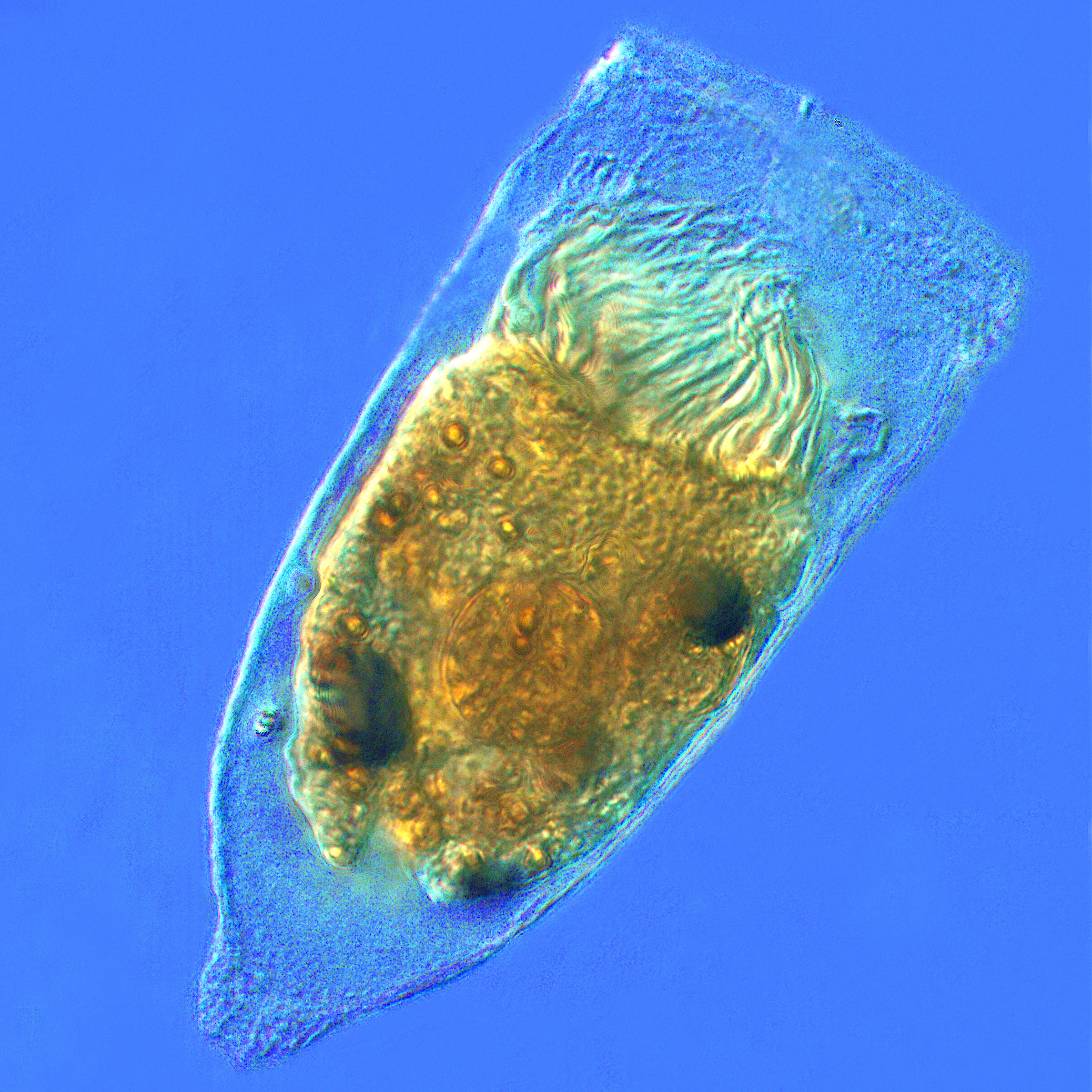
Tintinnid ciliate Favella

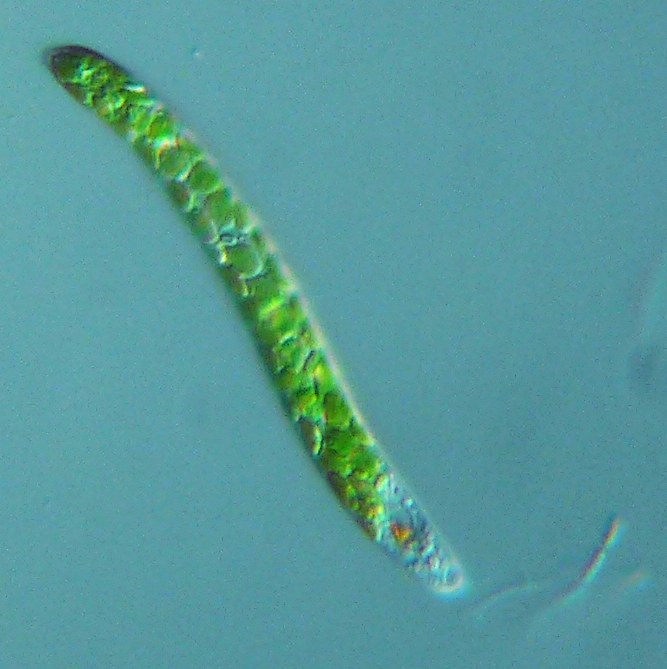
Euglena mutabilis, a photosynthetic flagellate

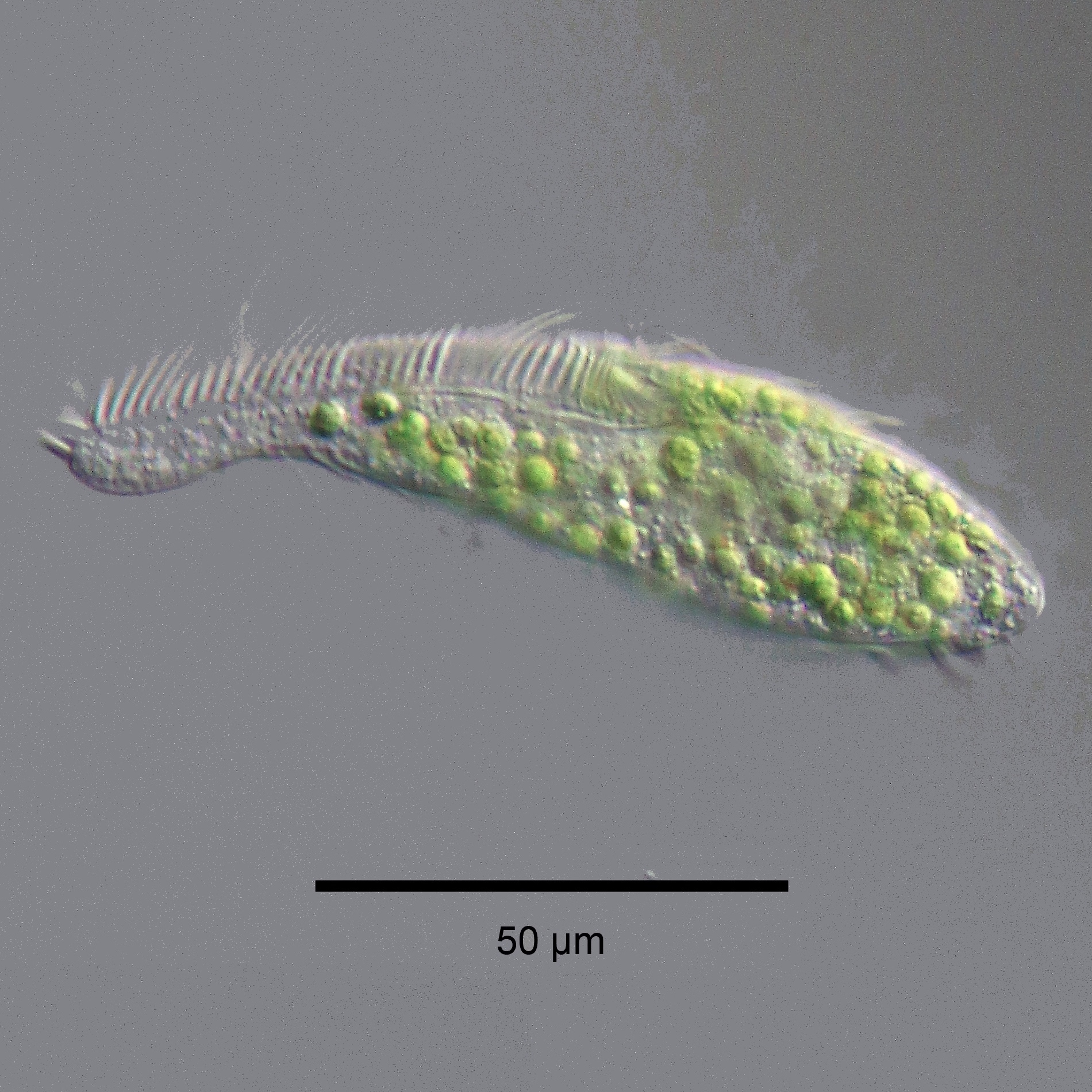
Zoochlorellae (green) living inside the ciliate Stichotricha secunda

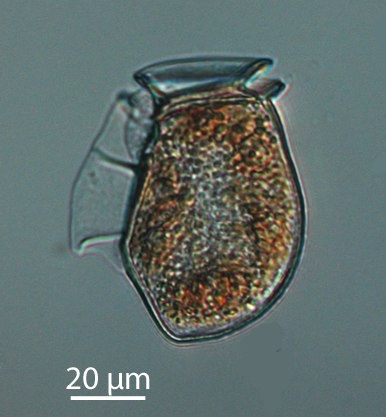
The dinoflagellate Dinophysis acuta
Mixotrophic radiolarians

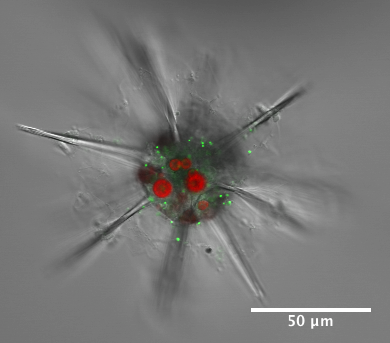
Acantharian radiolarian hosts Phaeocystis symbionts

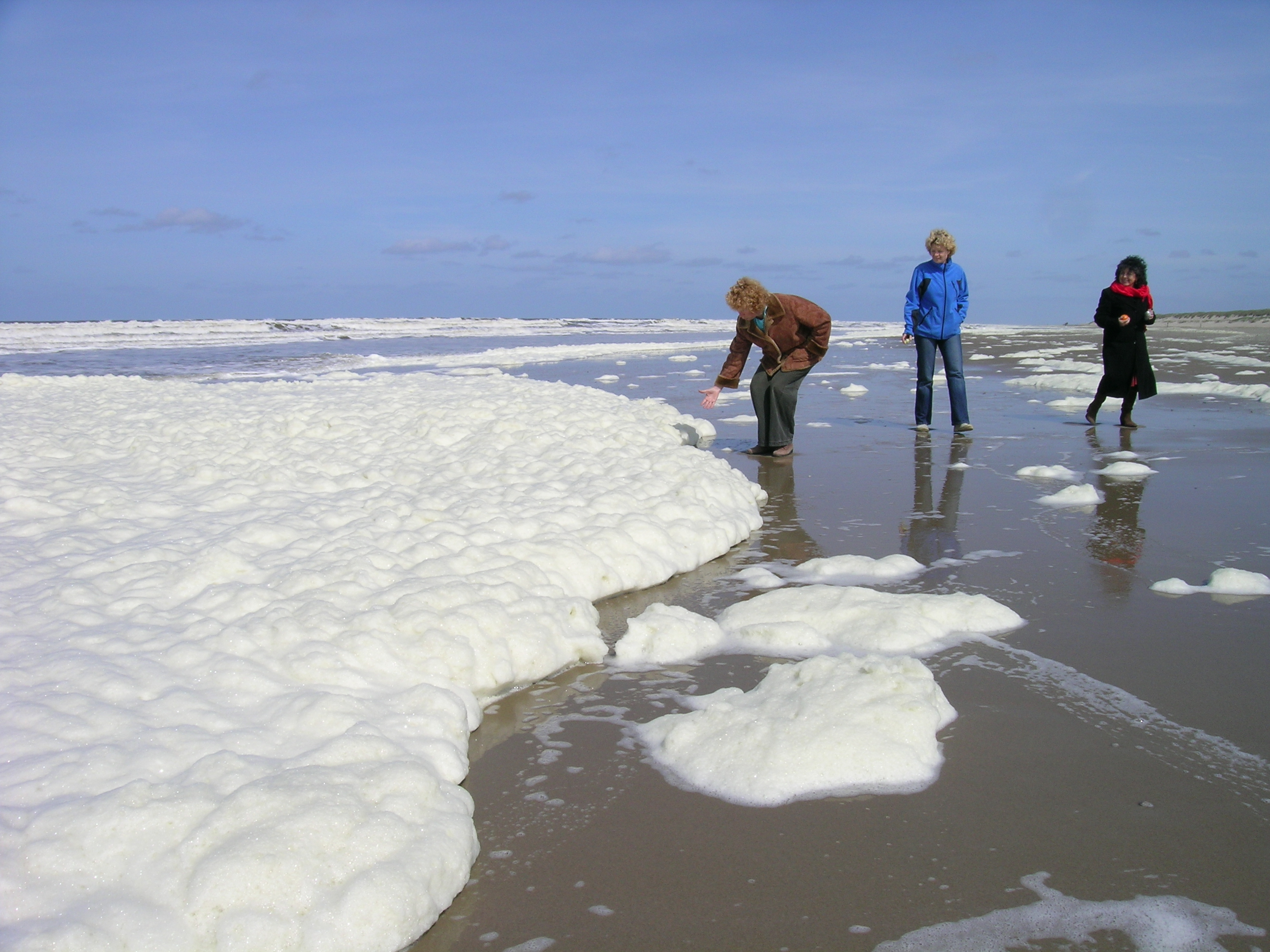
White Phaeocystis algal foam washing up on a beach

A number of forams are mixotrophic. These have unicellular algae as endosymbionts, from diverse lineages such as the green algae, red algae, golden algae, diatoms, and dinoflagellates. Mixotrophic foraminifers are particularly common in nutrient-poor oceanic waters. Some forams are kleptoplastic, retaining chloroplasts from ingested algae to conduct photosynthesis.

By trophic orientation, dinoflagellates are all over the place. Some dinoflagellates are known to be photosynthetic, but a large fraction of these are in fact mixotrophic, combining photosynthesis with ingestion of prey (phagotrophy). Some species are endosymbionts of marine animals and other protists, and play an important part in the biology of coral reefs. Others predate other protozoa, and a few forms are parasitic. Many dinoflagellates are mixotrophic and could also be classified as phytoplankton. The toxic dinoflagellate Dinophysis acuta acquires cryptophyte chloroplasts from its ciliate prey who in turn salvage chloroplasts from ingested cryptophytes. Stoecker et al. (2017) state that "[D. acuta] cannot catch the cryptophytes by itself, and instead relies on ingesting ciliates (red Myrionecta spp.), which sequester their chloroplasts from a specific cryptophyte clade (Geminigera/Plagioselmis/Teleaulax)".

=== Planktonic metazoa (animals) ===
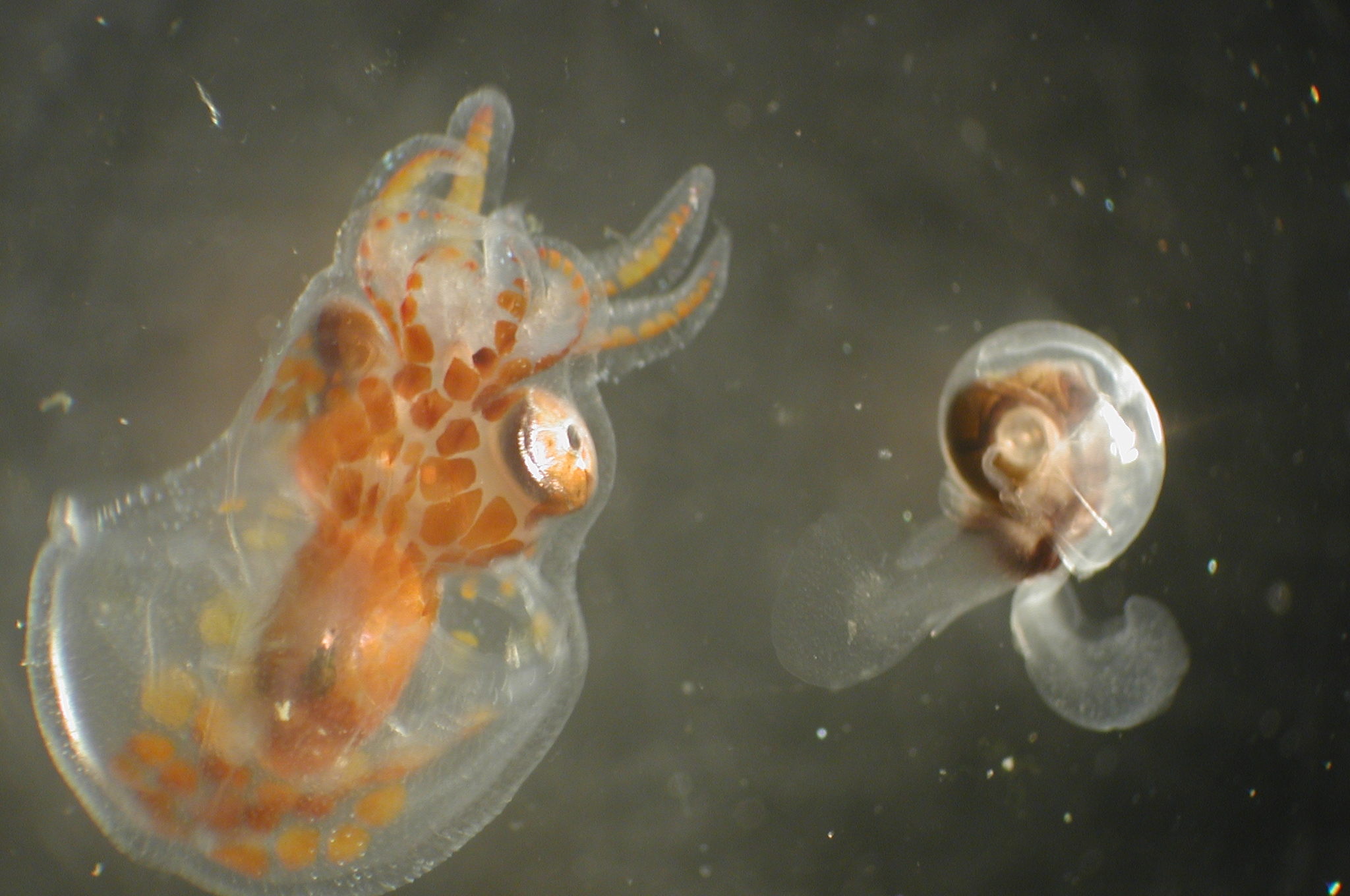
Octopus larva and pteropod

Free-living species in the crustacean class Copepoda are typically 1 to 2 mm long with teardrop-shaped bodies. Like all crustaceans, their bodies are divided into three sections: head, thorax, and abdomen, with two pairs of antennae; the first pair is often long and prominent. They have a tough exoskeleton made of calcium carbonate and usually have a single red eye in the centre of their transparent head. About 13,000 species of copepods are known, of which about 10,200 are marine. They are usually among the more dominant members of the zooplankton.

In addition to copepods the crustacean classes ostracods, branchiopods and malacostracans also have planktonic members. Barnacles are planktonic only during the larval stage.

Metazoan zooplankton

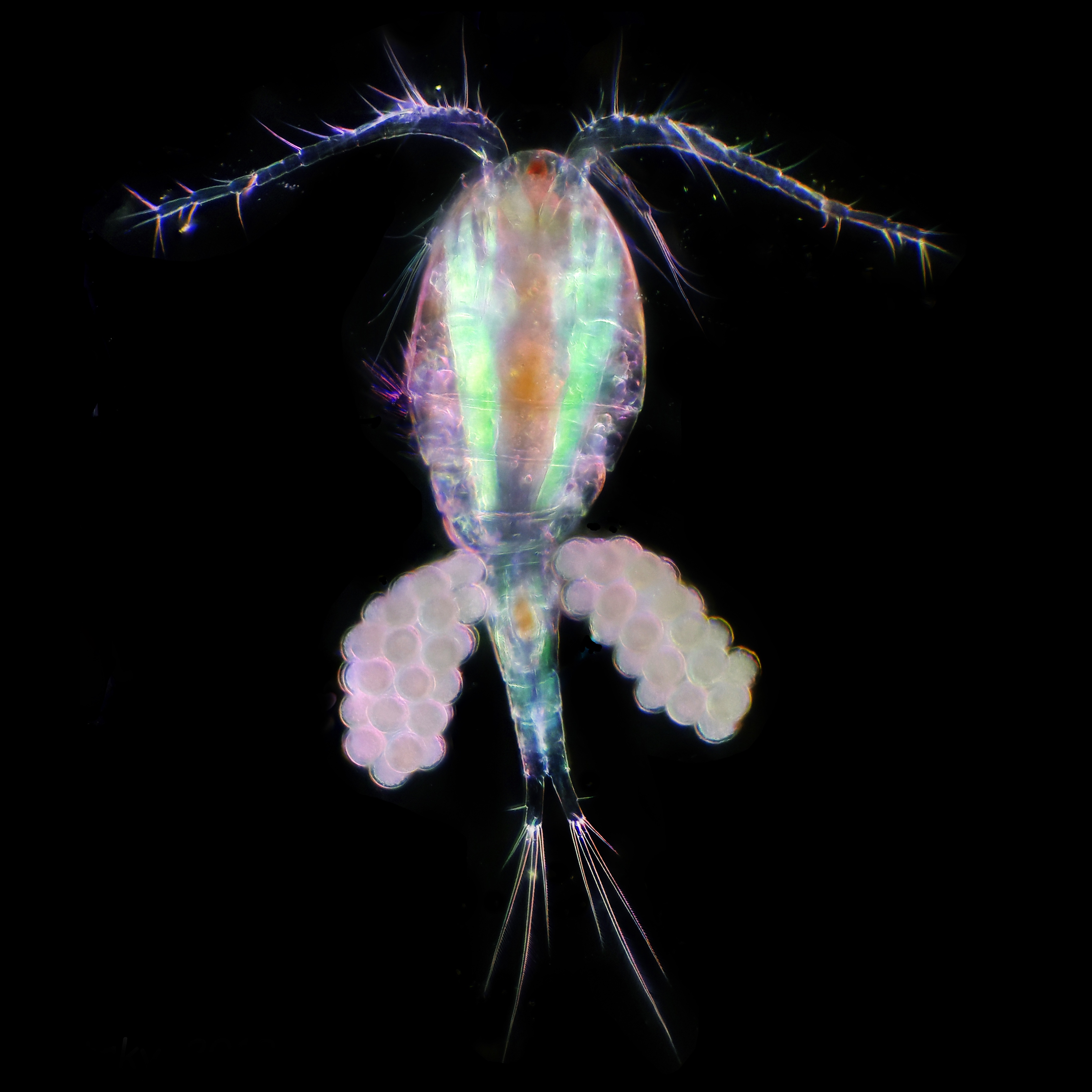
Copepod with eggs

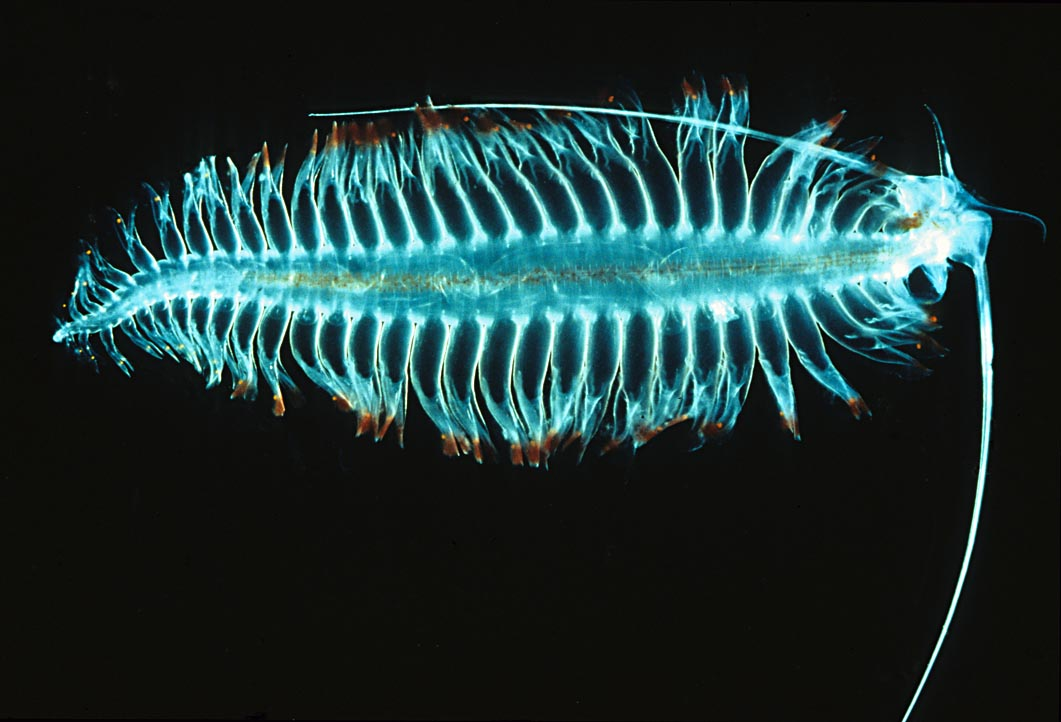
Segmented worm

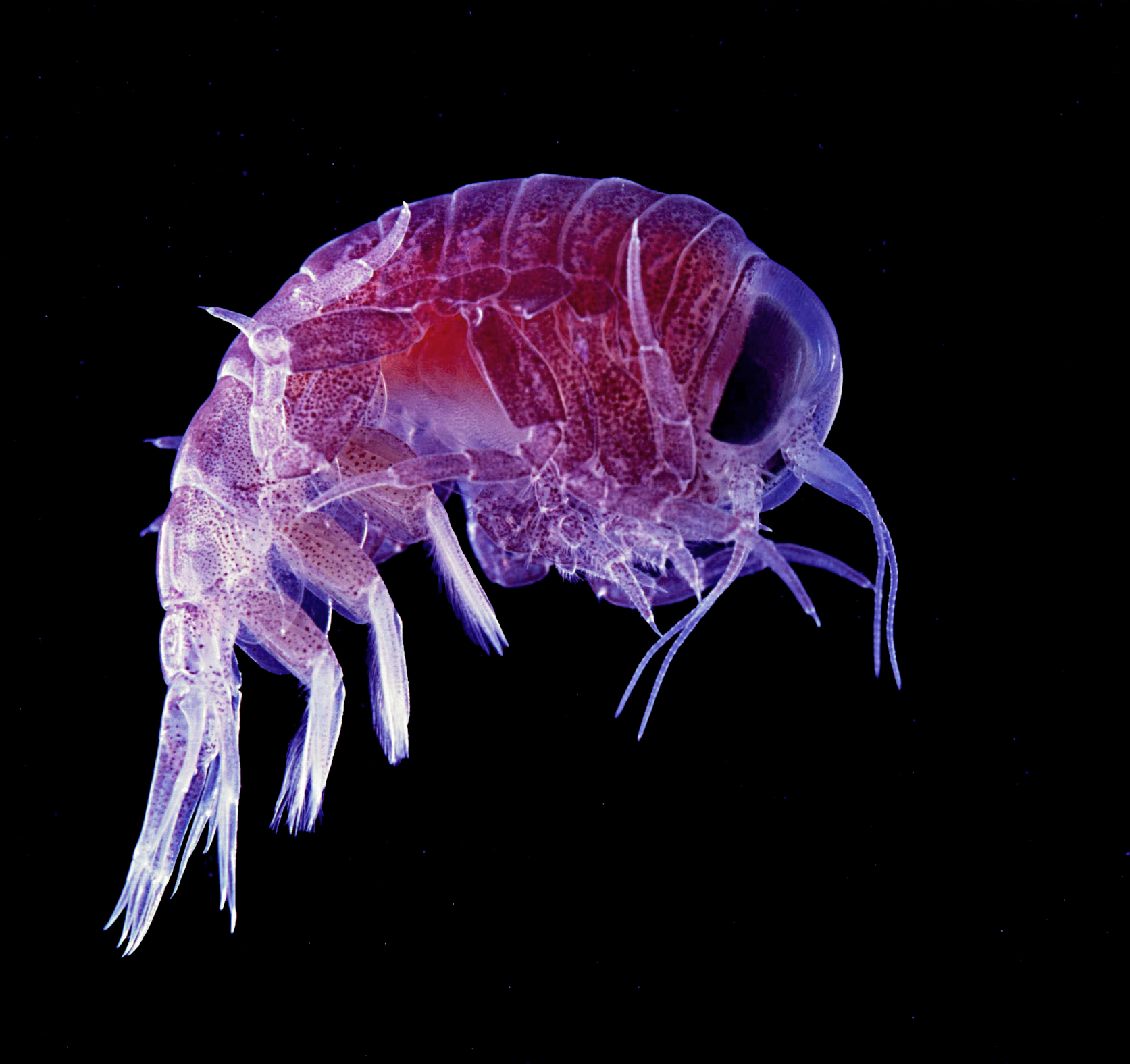
Amphipod

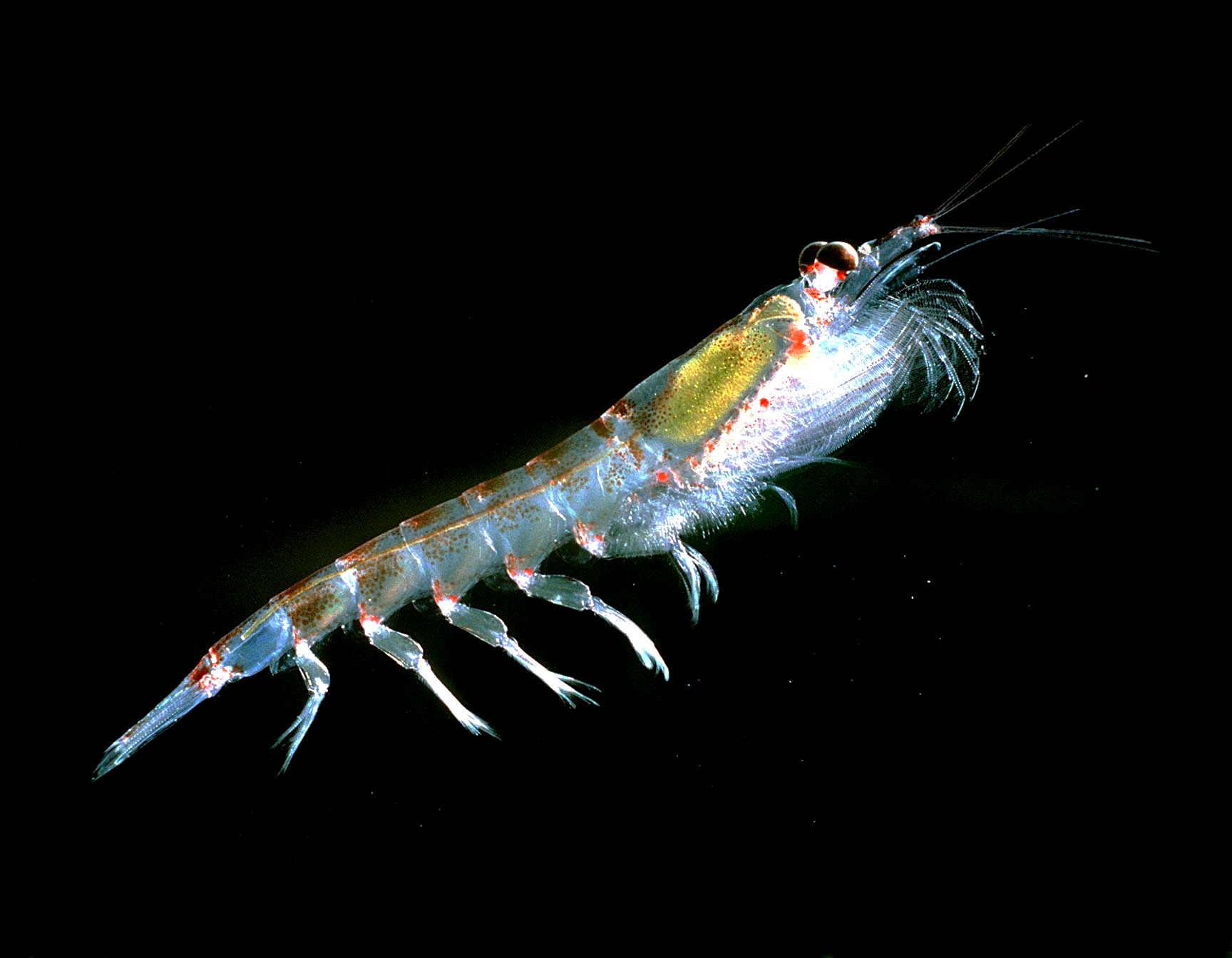
Krill

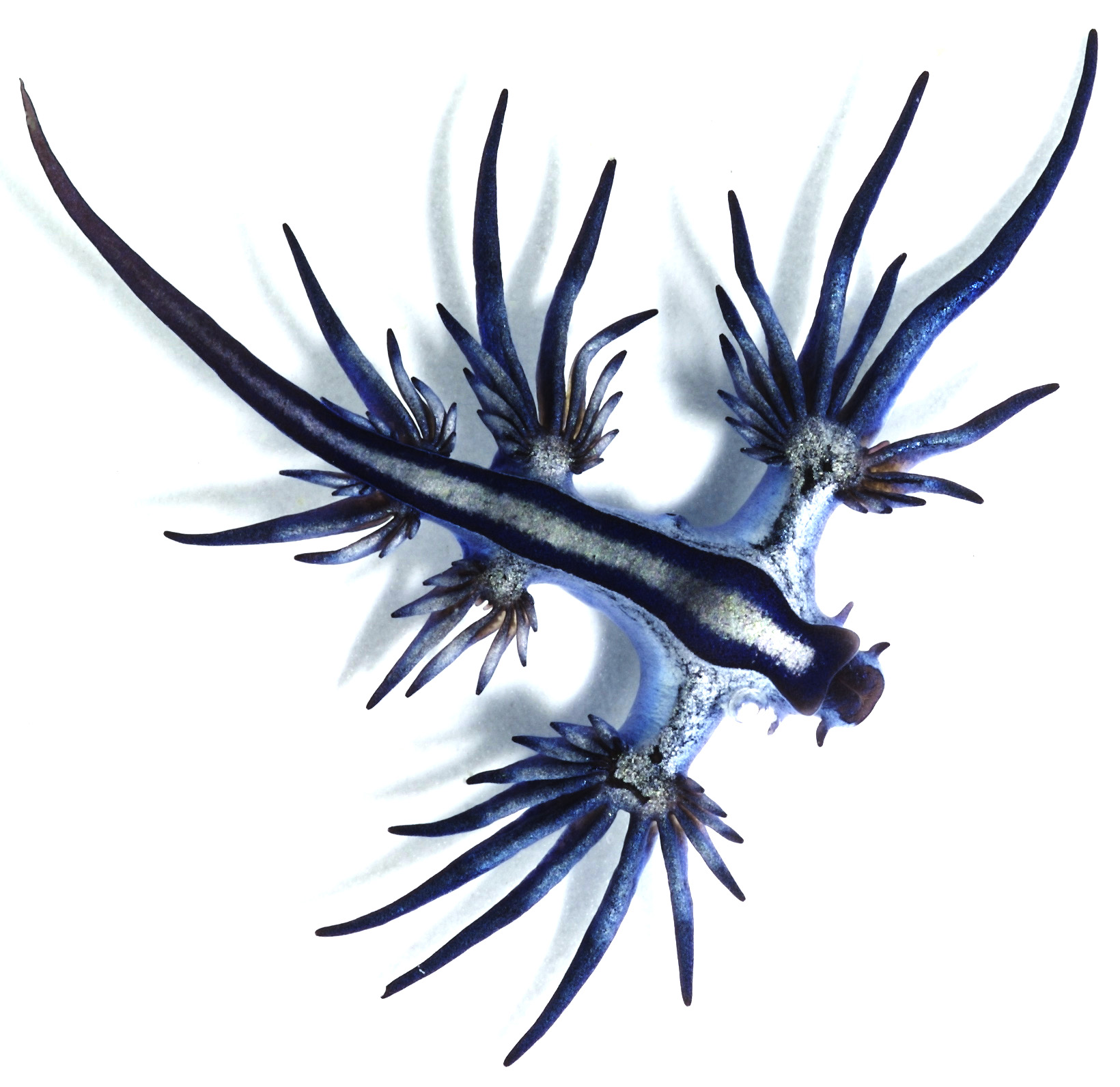
Blue ocean slug

==== Ichthyoplankton ====
Ichthyoplankton are the eggs and larvae of fish ("ichthyo" comes from the Greek word for fish). They are planktonic because they cannot swim effectively under their own power, but must drift with the ocean currents. Fish eggs cannot swim at all, and are unambiguously planktonic. Early stage larvae swim poorly, but later stage larvae swim better and cease to be planktonic as they grow into juvenile fish. Fish larvae are part of the zooplankton that eat smaller plankton, while fish eggs carry their own food supply. Both eggs and larvae are themselves eaten by larger animals.

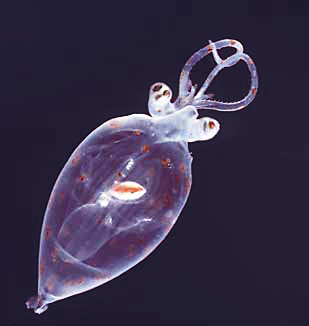
Juvenile planktonic squid

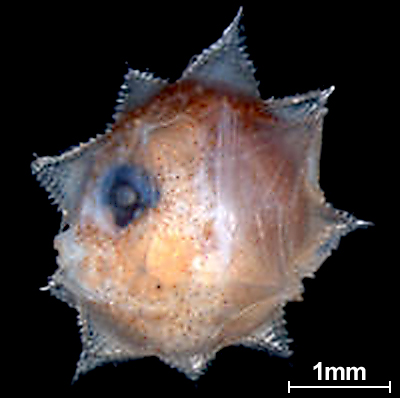
Ocean sunfish larvae (2.7mm)

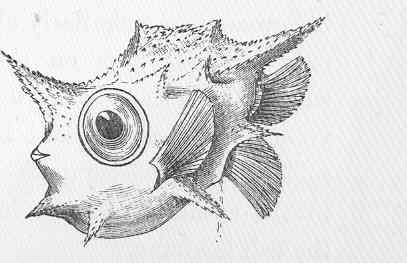
Boxfish larva

==== Gelatinous zooplankton ====
Gelatinous zooplankton include ctenophores, medusae, salps, and Chaetognatha in coastal waters. Jellyfish are slow swimmers, and most species form part of the plankton. Traditionally jellyfish have been viewed as trophic dead ends, minor players in the marine food web, gelatinous organisms with a body plan largely based on water that offers little nutritional value or interest for other organisms apart from a few specialised predators such as the ocean sunfish and the leatherback sea turtle.

That view has recently been challenged. Jellyfish, and more gelatinous zooplankton in general, which include salps and ctenophores, are very diverse, fragile with no hard parts, difficult to see and monitor, subject to rapid population swings and often live inconveniently far from shore or deep in the ocean. It is difficult for scientists to detect and analyse jellyfish in the guts of predators, since they turn to mush when eaten and are rapidly digested. But jellyfish bloom in vast numbers, and it has been shown they form major components in the diets of tuna, spearfish and swordfish as well as various birds and invertebrates such as octopus, sea cucumbers, crabs and amphipods. "Despite their low energy density, the contribution of jellyfish to the energy budgets of predators may be much greater than assumed because of rapid digestion, low capture costs, availability, and selective feeding on the more energy-rich components. Feeding on jellyfish may make marine predators susceptible to ingestion of plastics." According to a 2017 study, narcomedusae consume the greatest diversity of mesopelagic prey, followed by physonect siphonophores, ctenophores and cephalopods.

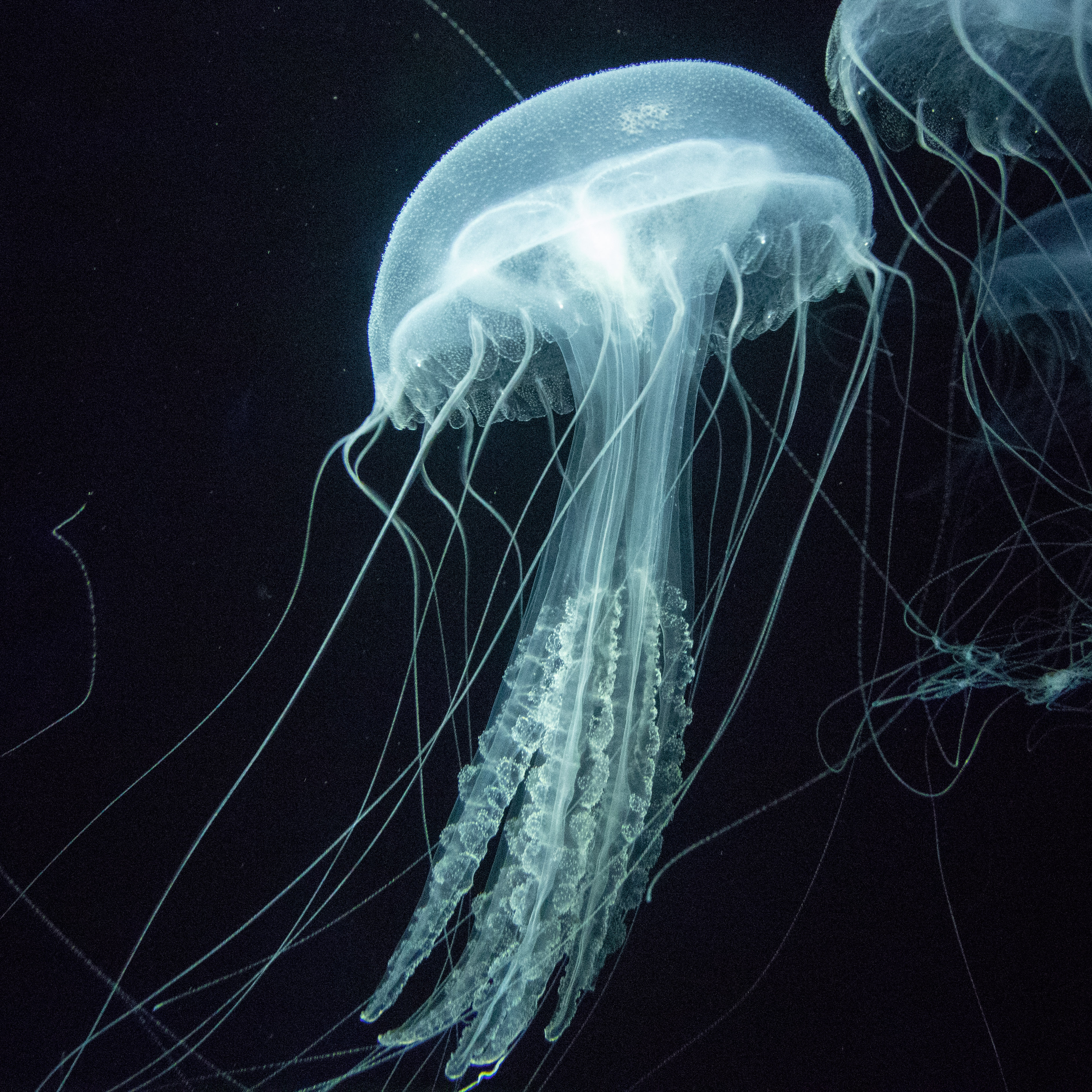
Jellyfish

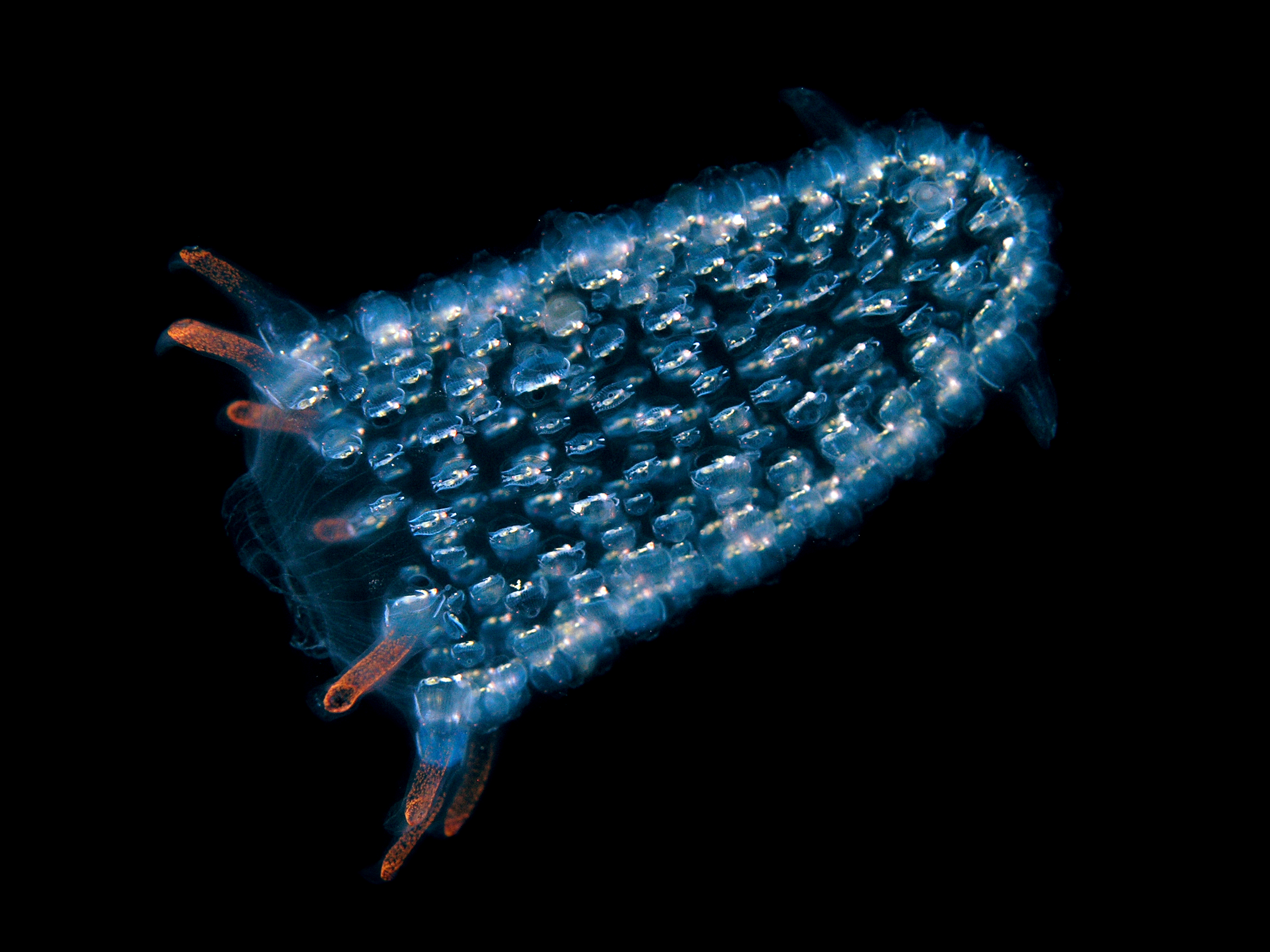
This free-floating pyrosome is made up of hundreds of individual bioluminescent tunicates

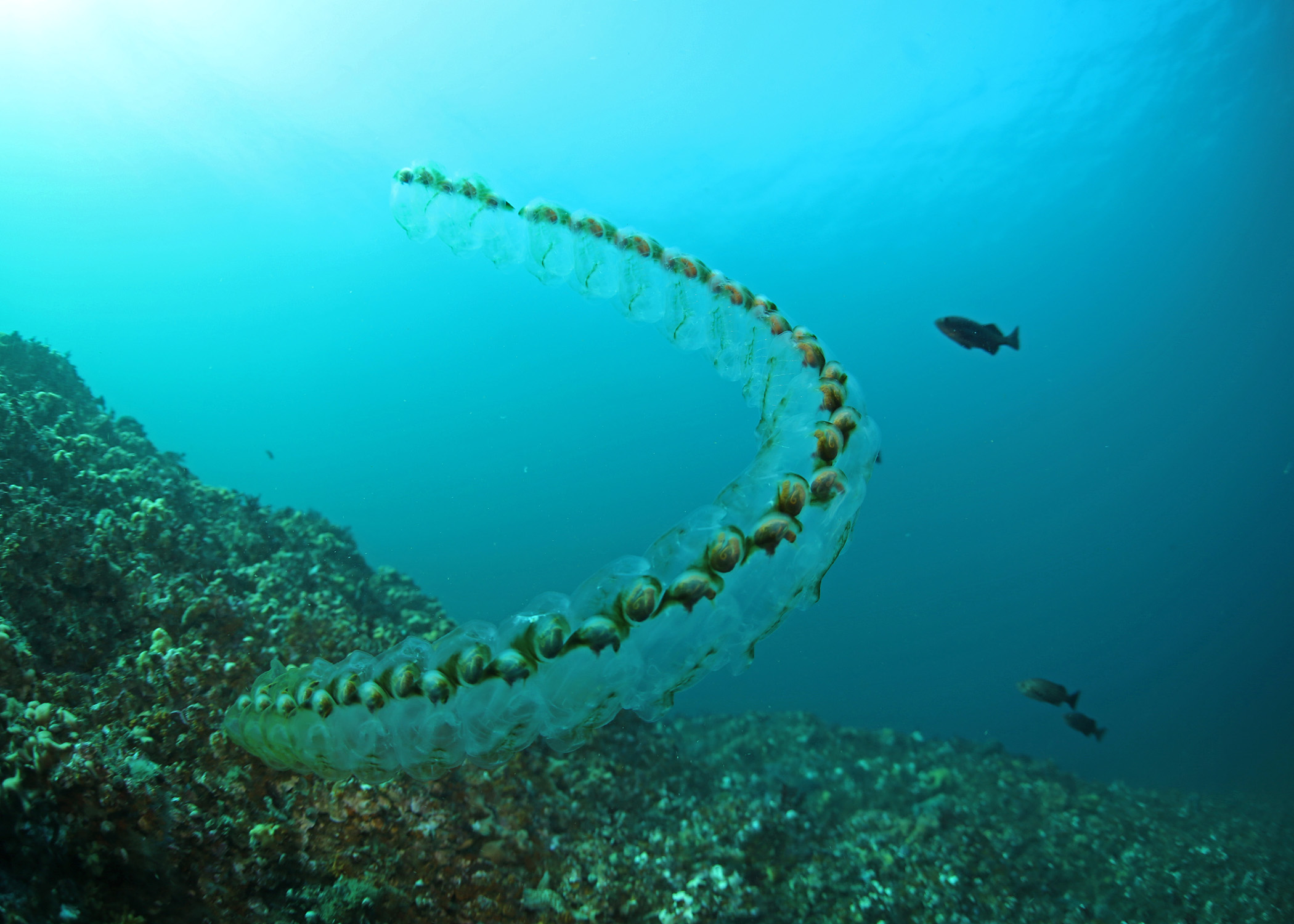
Salp chain

The importance of the so-called "jelly web" is only beginning to be understood, but it seems medusae, ctenophores and siphonophores can be key predators in deep pelagic food webs with ecological impacts similar to predator fish and squid. Traditionally gelatinous predators were thought ineffectual providers of marine trophic pathways, but they appear to have substantial and integral roles in deep pelagic food webs.

== Role in food webs ==
Grazing by single-celled zooplankton accounts for the majority of organic carbon loss from marine primary production. However, zooplankton grazing remains one of the key unknowns in global predictive models of carbon flux, the marine food web structure and ecosystem characteristics, because empirical grazing measurements are sparse, resulting in poor parameterisation of grazing functions. To overcome this critical knowledge gap, it has been suggested that a focused effort be placed on the development of instrumentation that can link changes in phytoplankton biomass or optical properties with grazing.

Grazing is a central, rate-setting process in ocean ecosystems and a driver of marine biogeochemical cycling. In all ocean ecosystems, grazing by heterotrophic protists constitutes the single largest loss factor of marine primary production and alters particle size distributions. Grazing affects all pathways of export production, rendering grazing important both for surface and deep carbon processes. Predicting central paradigms of ocean ecosystem function, including responses to environmental change requires accurate representation of grazing in global biogeochemical, ecosystem and cross-biome-comparison models. Several large-scale analyses have concluded that phytoplankton losses, which are dominated by grazing are the putative explanation for annual cycles in phytoplankton biomass, accumulation rates and export production.

Pelagic food web

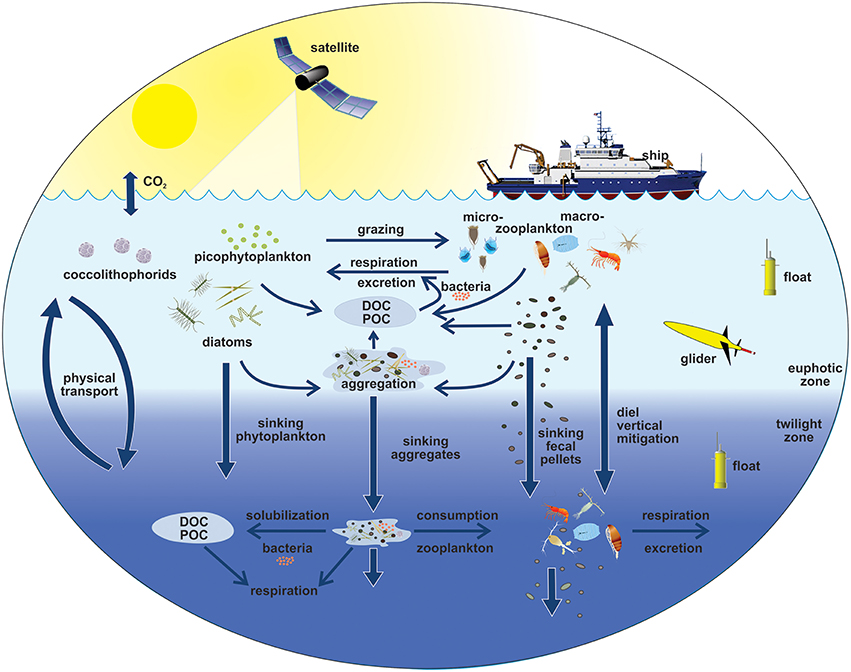
Pelagic food web and the biological pump. Links among the ocean's biological pump and pelagic food web and the ability to sample these components remotely from ships, satellites, and autonomous vehicles. Light blue waters are the euphotic zone, while the darker blue waters represent the twilight zone.

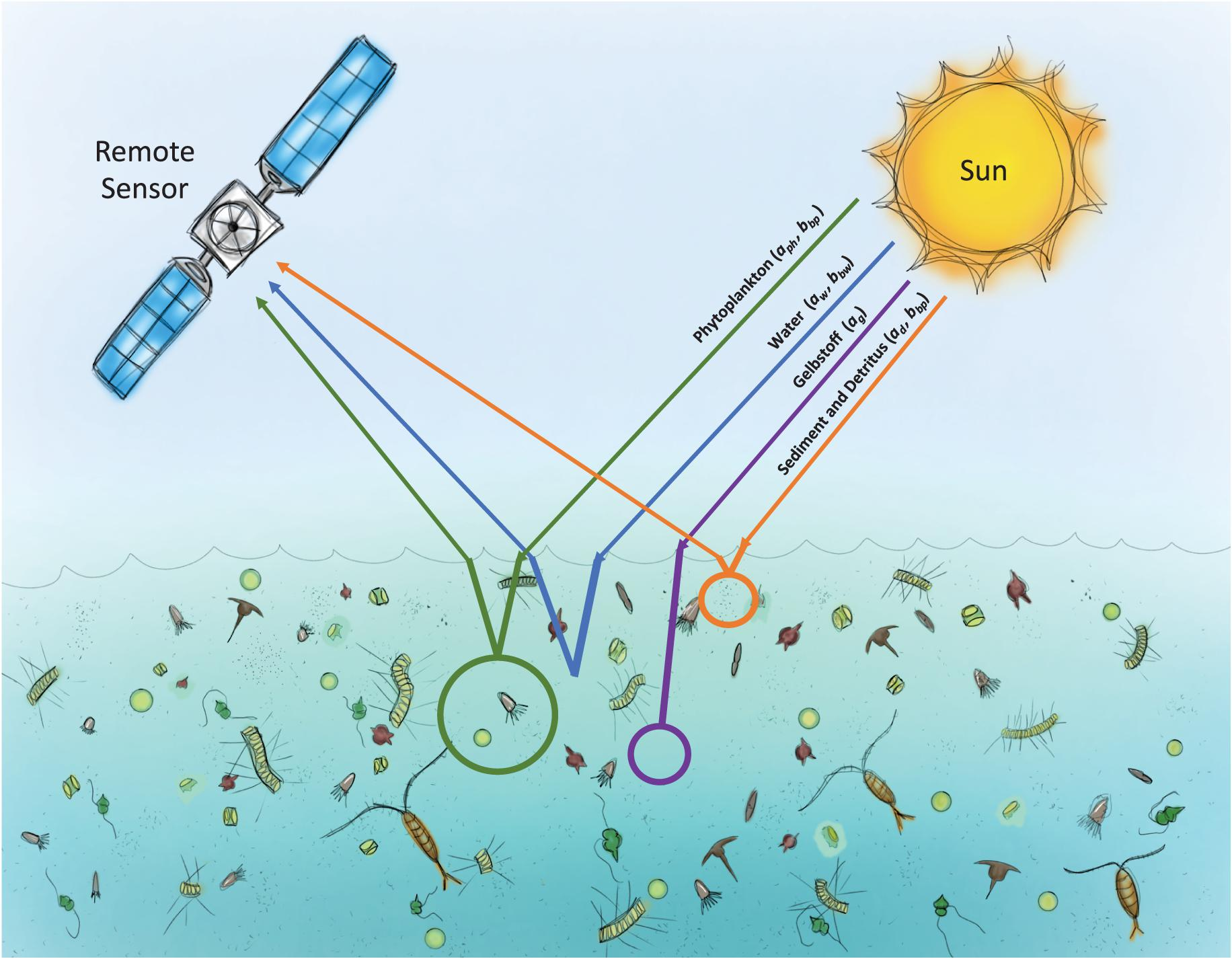
Schematic of how common seawater constituents, including particulate and dissolved components, could both be generated and altered through the process of herbivorous zooplankton grazing

== Role in biogeochemistry ==
In addition to linking primary producers to higher trophic levels in marine food webs, zooplankton also play an important role as "recyclers" of carbon and other nutrients that significantly impact marine biogeochemical cycles, including the biological pump. This is particularly important in the oligotrophic waters of the open ocean. Through sloppy feeding, excretion, egestion, and leaching of fecal pellets, zooplankton release dissolved organic matter (DOM) which controls DOM cycling and supports the microbial loop. Absorption efficiency, respiration, and prey size all further complicate how zooplankton are able to transform and deliver carbon to the deep ocean.

=== Sloppy feeding and release of DOM ===
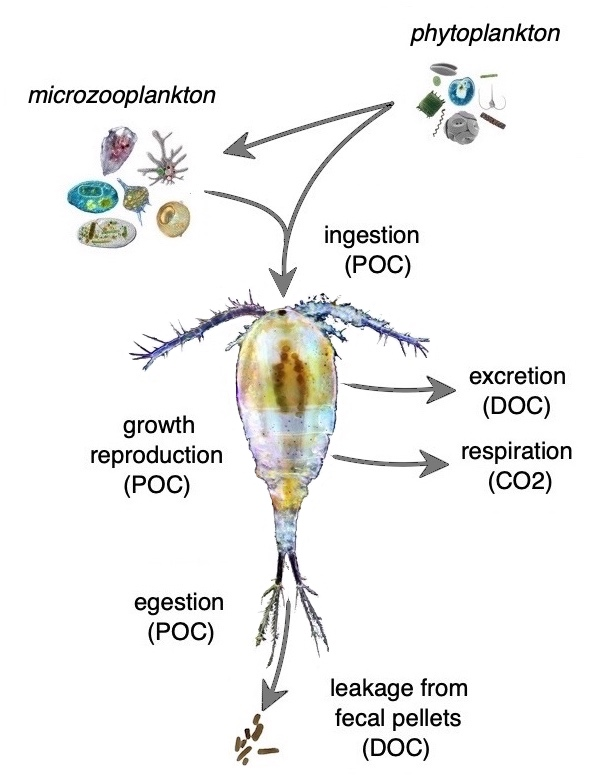
Sloppy feeding by zooplankton DOC = dissolved organic carbon POC = particulate organic carbon Adapted from Møller et al. (2005), Saba et al. (2009) and Steinberg et al. (2017).

Excretion and sloppy feeding (the physical breakdown of food source) make up 80% and 20% of crustacean zooplankton-mediated DOM release respectively. In the same study, fecal pellet leaching was found to be an insignificant contributor. For protozoan grazers, DOM is released primarily through excretion and egestion and gelatinous zooplankton can also release DOM through the production of mucus. Leaching of fecal pellets can extend from hours to days after initial egestion and its effects can vary depending on food concentration and quality. Various factors can affect how much DOM is released from zooplankton individuals or populations. Absorption efficiency (AE) is the proportion of food absorbed by plankton that determines how available the consumed organic materials are in meeting the required physiological demands. Depending on the feeding rate and prey composition, variations in AE may lead to variations in fecal pellet production, and thus regulates how much organic material is recycled back to the marine environment. Low feeding rates typically lead to high AE and small, dense pellets, while high feeding rates typically lead to low AE and larger pellets with more organic content. Another contributing factor to DOM release is respiration rate. Physical factors such as oxygen availability, pH, and light conditions may affect overall oxygen consumption and how much carbon is loss from zooplankton in the form of respired CO_{2}. The relative sizes of zooplankton and prey also mediate how much carbon is released via sloppy feeding. Smaller prey are ingested whole, whereas larger prey may be fed on more "sloppily", that is more biomatter is released through inefficient consumption. There is also evidence that diet composition can impact nutrient release, with carnivorous diets releasing more dissolved organic carbon (DOC) and ammonium than omnivorous diets.

Comparison of zooplankton-mediated carbon cycles

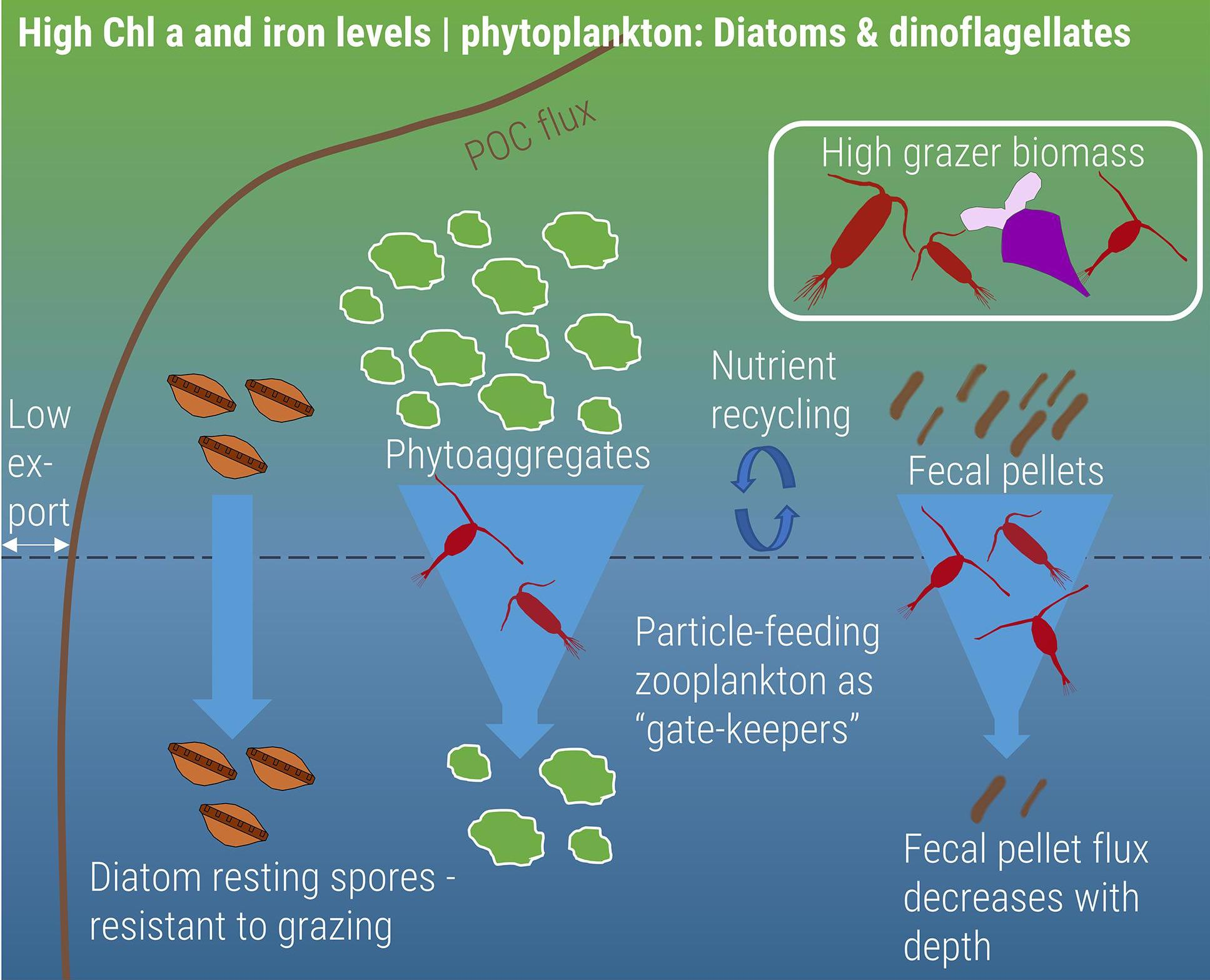
Kerguelen Plateau
Naturally iron-fertilized
On the Kerguelen Plateau in summer, high iron levels lead to high chlorophyll a as a proxy for algae biomass at the surface. The diverse zooplankton community feeds on the sinking particle flux and acts as a gate-keeper to the deeper ocean by ingesting and fragmenting sinking particles and, consequently, significantly reducing the export flux out of the epipelagic. The main export particles are diatom resting spores, which bypass the intense grazing pressure, followed by fecal pellets.

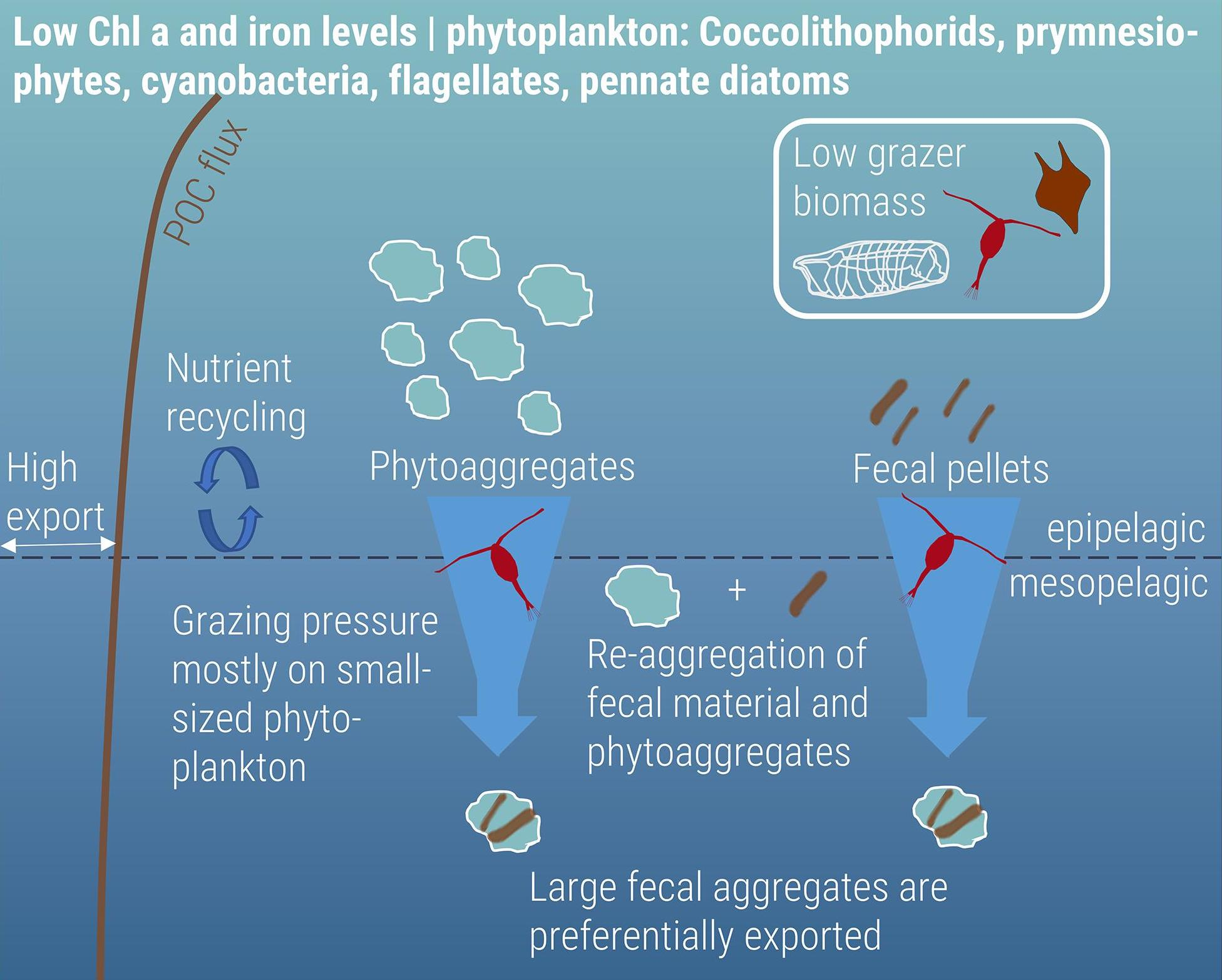
Southern Ocean waters
High nutrient, low chlorophyll
In Southern Ocean waters in summer, iron levels are relatively low and support a more diverse phytoplankton community, but with lower biomass, which, in turn, affects zooplankton community composition and biomass. The grazing pressure during summer is focused mostly on picoplankton, which leaves large particles for export.

Grazing and fragmentation of particles at both sites increases nutrient recycling in the upper water column

=== Carbon export ===
Zooplankton play a critical role in supporting the ocean's biological pump through various forms of carbon export, including the production of fecal pellets, mucous feeding webs, molts, and carcasses. Fecal pellets are estimated to be a large contributor to this export, with copepod size rather than abundance expected to determine how much carbon actually reaches the ocean floor. The importance of fecal pellets can vary both by time and location. For example, zooplankton bloom events can produce larger quantities of fecal pellets, resulting in greater measures of carbon export. Additionally, as fecal pellets sink, they are reworked by microbes in the water column, which can thus alter the carbon composition of the pellet. This affects how much carbon is recycled in the euphotic zone and how much reaches depth. Fecal pellet contribution to carbon export is likely underestimated; however, new advances in quantifying this production are currently being developed, including the use of isotopic signatures of amino acids to characterize how much carbon is being exported via zooplankton fecal pellet production. Carcasses are also gaining recognition as being important contributors to carbon export. Jelly falls – the mass sinking of gelatinous zooplankton carcasses – occur across the world as a result of large blooms. Because of their large size, these gelatinous zooplankton are expected to hold a larger carbon content, making their sinking carcasses a potentially important source of food for benthic organisms.

== See also ==
- Census of Marine Zooplankton
- Diel vertical migration
- Ocean acidification
- Primary production
- Thin layers (oceanography)
