= Mixoplankton =

Plankton that can both photosynthesize and eat other organisms

A mixoplankton is a mixotrophic plankton, capable of both photosynthesis and predation. It is a unicellular plankton that can use a mix of different sources of energy and carbon, instead of having a single trophic mode on the continuum from complete autotrophy at one end to heterotrophy at the other. It is estimated that mixoplankton comprise more than half of all microscopic plankton. There are two types of mixoplankton: those with their own chloroplasts, and those with endosymbionts—and others that acquire them through kleptoplasty or by enslaving the entire phototrophic cell.

== Overview ==
Plankton have traditionally been categorized as producer, consumer, and recycler groups, but some plankton are able to benefit from more than just one trophic level. In this mixed trophic strategy—known as mixotrophy—organisms act as both producers and consumers, either at the same time or switching between modes of nutrition in response to ambient conditions. This makes it possible to use photosynthesis for growth when nutrients and light are abundant, but switch to eating phytoplankton, zooplankton or each other when growing conditions are poor. Mixotrophs are divided into two groups; constitutive mixotrophs (CMs) which are able to perform photosynthesis on their own, and non-constitutive mixotrophs (NCMs) which use phagocytosis to engulf phototrophic prey that are either kept alive inside the host cell, which benefits from its photosynthesis, or they digested, except for the plastids, which continue to perform photosynthesis (kleptoplasty).

Recognition of the importance of mixotrophy as an ecological strategy is increasing, as well as the wider role this may play in marine biogeochemistry. Studies have shown that mixotrophs are much more important for marine ecology than previously assumed and comprise more than half of all microscopic plankton. Their presence acts as a buffer that prevents the collapse of ecosystems during times with little to no light.

Mixoplankton

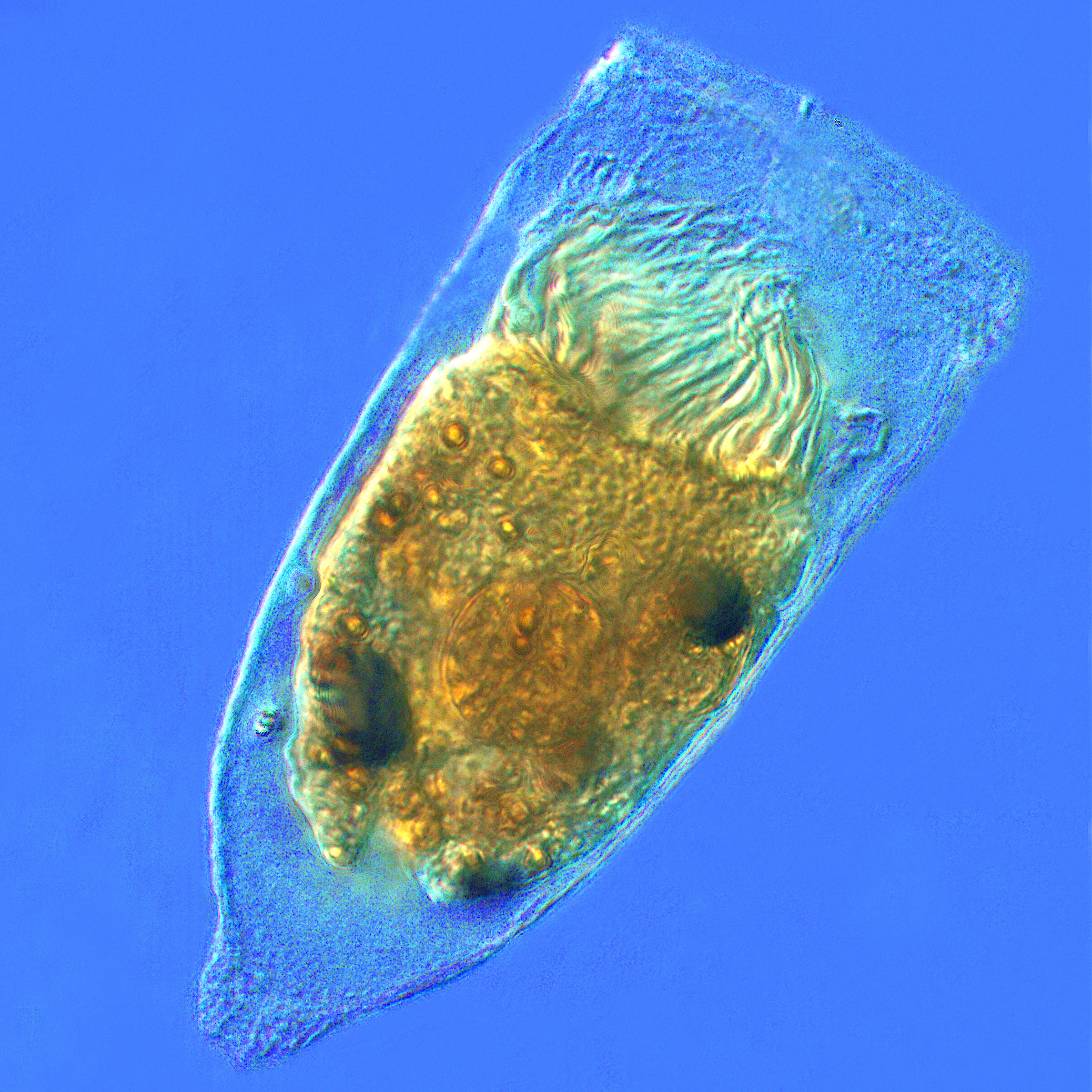
Tintinnid ciliate Favella

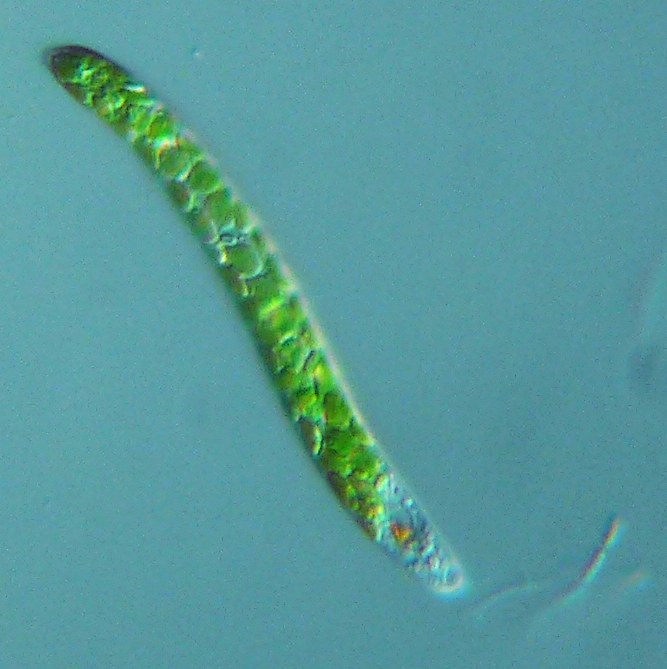
Euglena mutabilis, a photosynthetic flagellate

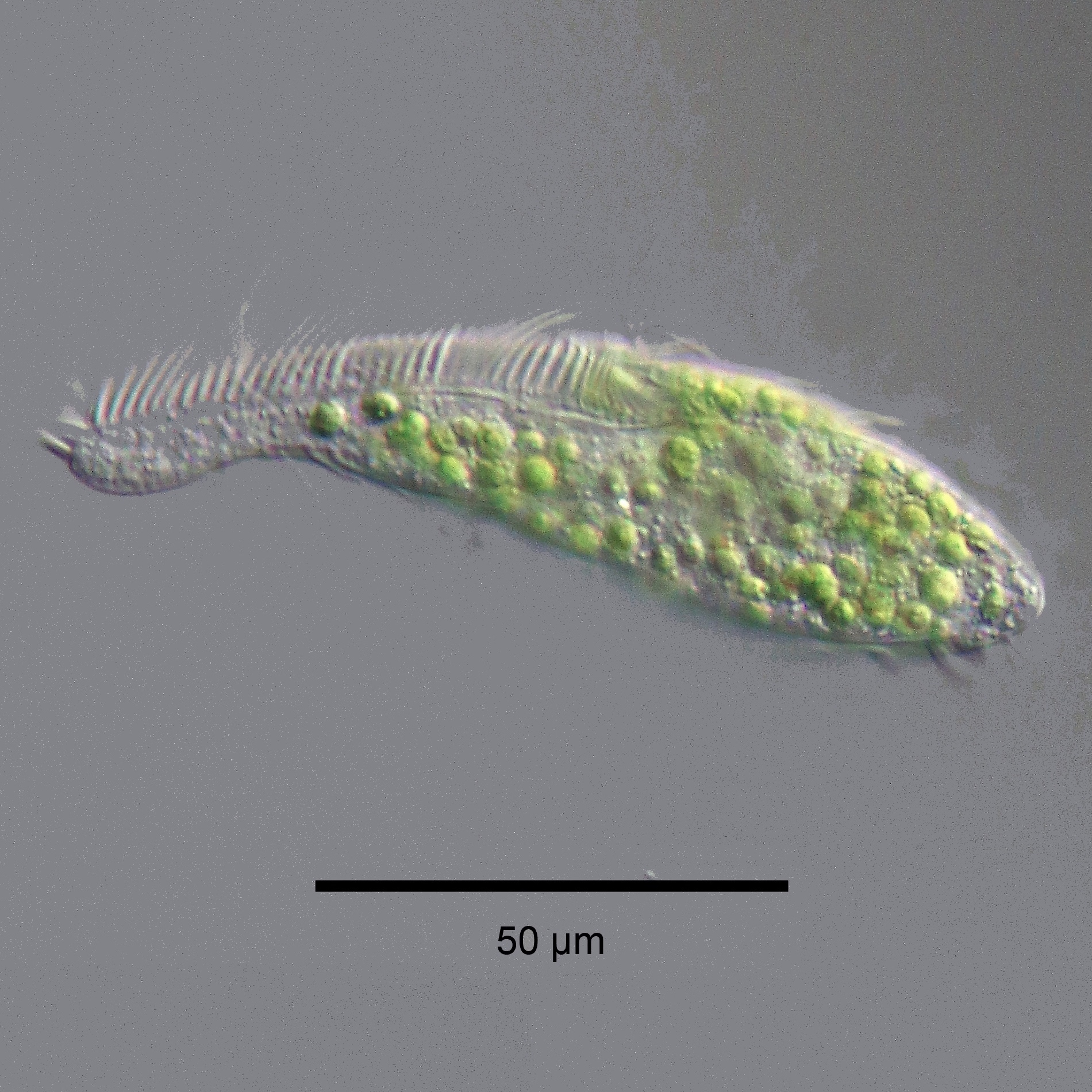
Zoochlorellae (green) living inside the ciliate Stichotricha secunda

The distinction between plants and animals often breaks down in very small organisms. Possible combinations are photo- and chemotrophy, litho- and organotrophy, auto- and heterotrophy or other combinations of these. Mixotrophs can be either eukaryotic or prokaryotic. They can take advantage of different environmental conditions.

A 2017 study of marine microzooplankton found 30–45% of the ciliate abundance was mixotrophic, and up to 65% of the amoeboid, foram and radiolarian biomass was mixotrophic.

== Mixoplankton combining phototrophy and heterotrophy ==
Mixotrophic plankton that combine phototrophy and heterotrophy – table based on Stoecker et al., 2017
General types	Description		Example	Further examples
Bacterioplankton	Photoheterotrophic bacterioplankton		Vibrio cholerae	Roseobacter spp. Erythrobacter spp. Gammaproteobacterial clade OM60; Widespread among bacteria and archaea
Phytoplankton	Called constitutive mixotrophs by Mitra et al., 2016. Phytoplankton that eat: photosynthetic protists with inherited plastids and the capacity to ingest prey.		Ochromonas species	Ochromonas spp. Prymnesium parvum Dinoflagellate examples: Fragilidium subglobosum,Heterocapsa triquetra,Karlodinium veneficum,Neoceratium furca,Prorocentrum minimum
Zooplankton	Called nonconstitutive mixotrophs by Mitra et al., 2016. Zooplankton that are photosynthetic: microzooplankton or metazoan zooplankton that acquire phototrophy through chloroplast retention^{a} or maintenance of algal endosymbionts.			
Zooplankton	Generalists	Protists that retain chloroplasts and rarely other organelles from many algal taxa		Most oligotrich ciliates that retain plastids^{a}
Zooplankton	Specialists	1. Protists that retain chloroplasts and sometimes other organelles from one algal species or very closely related algal species	Dinophysis acuminata	Dinophysis spp. Myrionecta rubra
Zooplankton	Specialists	2. Protists or zooplankton with algal endosymbionts of only one algal species or very closely related algal species	Noctiluca scintillans	Metazooplankton with algal endosymbionts Most mixotrophic Rhizaria (Acantharea, Polycystinea, and Foraminifera); Green Noctiluca scintillans
^{a}Chloroplast (or plastid) retention = sequestration = enslavement. Some plastid-retaining species also retain other organelles and prey cytoplasm.

== Mixotrophic dinoflagellates ==
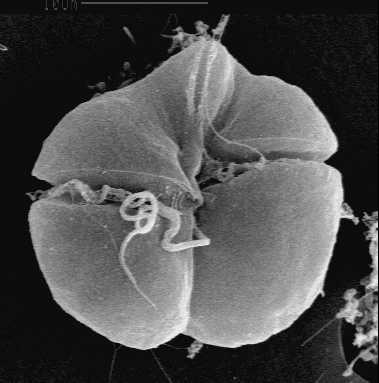
The mixotrophic dinoflagellate Karenia brevis, known for causing harmful algal blooms (red tides)

Dinoflagellates are eukaryotic plankton, existing in marine and freshwater environments. Previously, dinoflagellates had been grouped into two categories, phagotrophs and phototrophs. Mixotrophs, however include a combination of phagotrophy and phototrophy. Mixotrophic dinoflagellates are a sub-type of planktonic dinoflagellates and are part of the phylum Dinoflagellata. They are flagellated eukaryotes that combine photoautotrophy when light is available, and heterotrophy via phagocytosis. Dinoflagellates are one of the most diverse and numerous species of phytoplankton, second to diatoms.

Dinoflagellates have long whip-like structures called flagella that allow them to move freely throughout the water column. They are mainly marine but can also be found in freshwater environments. Combinations of phototrophy and phagotrophy allow organisms to supplement their inorganic nutrient uptake This means an increased trophic transfer to higher levels in food web compared to the traditional food web.

Mixotrophic dinoflagellates have the ability to thrive in changing ocean environments, resulting in shifts in red tide phenomenon and paralytic shellfish poisoning. It is unknown as to how many species of dinoflagellates have mixotrophic capabilities, as this is a relatively new feeding-mechanism discovery.

== Other examples ==
Mixotrophic radiolarians

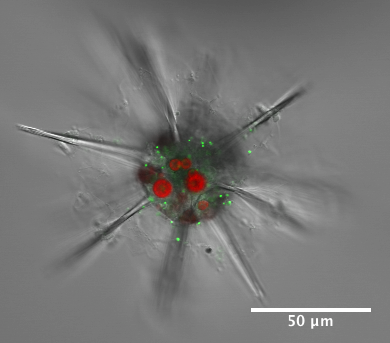
Acantharian radiolarian hosts Phaeocystis symbionts

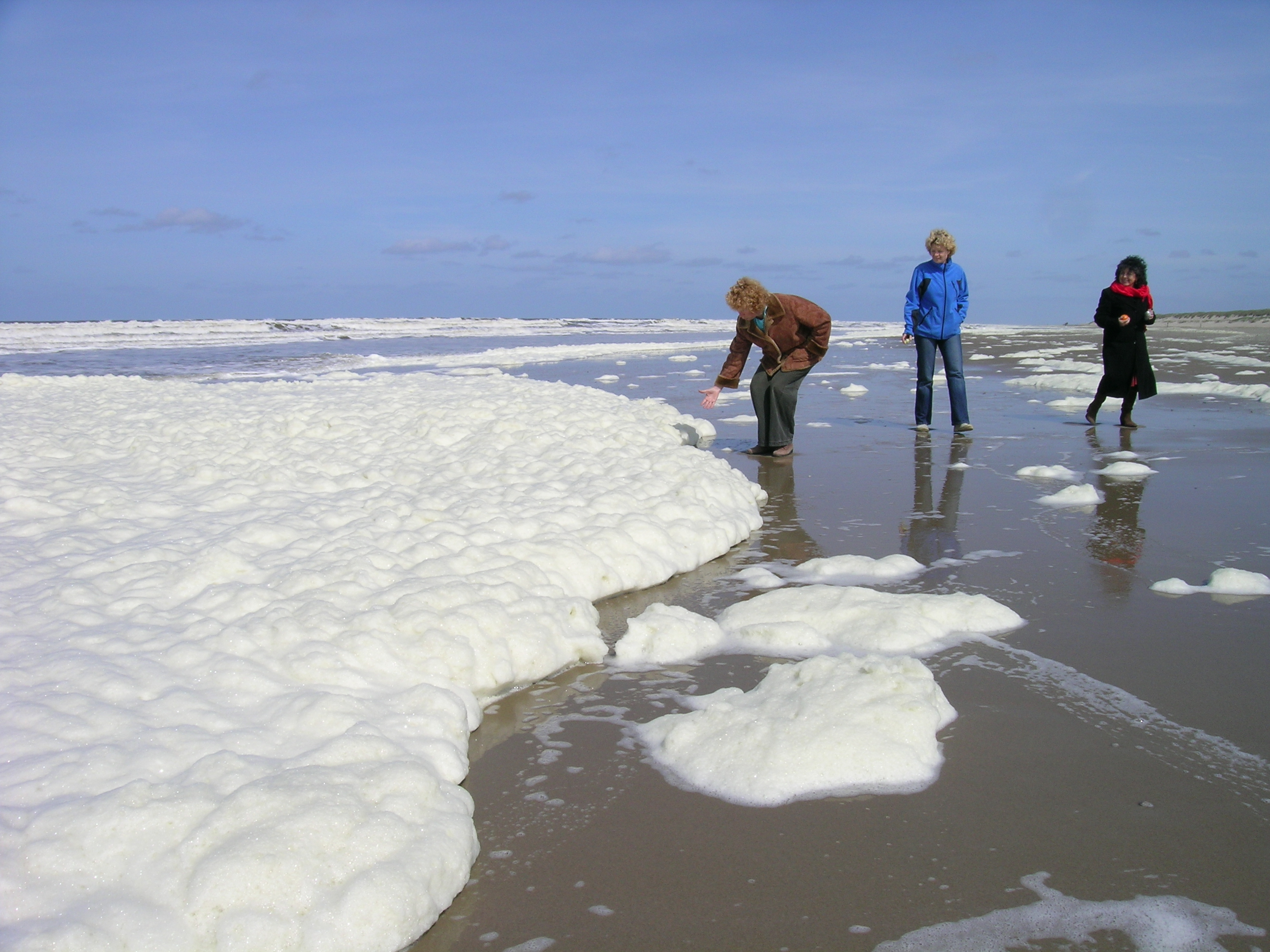
White Phaeocystis algal foam washing up on a beach

Phaeocystis is an important algal genus found as part of the marine phytoplankton around the world. It has a polymorphic life cycle, ranging from free-living cells to large colonies. It has the ability to form floating colonies, where hundreds of cells are embedded in a gel matrix, which can increase massively in size during blooms. As a result, Phaeocystis is an important contributor to the marine carbon and sulfur cycles. Phaeocystis species are endosymbionts to acantharian radiolarians.

== Biological pump ==
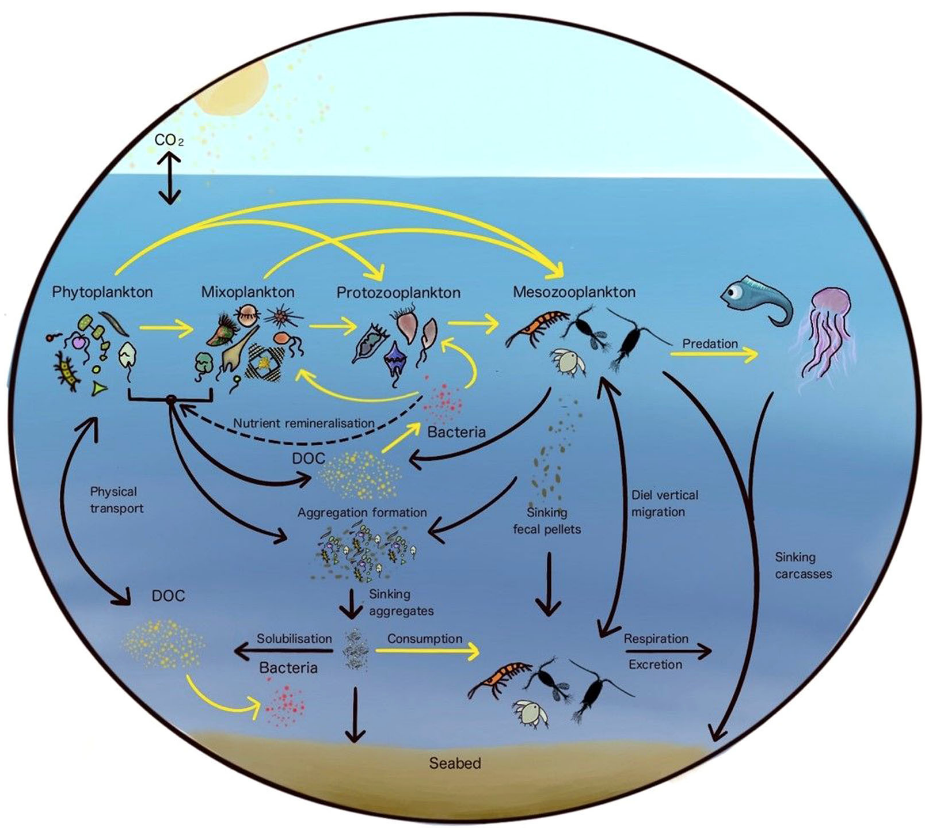
The biological carbon pump including mixoplankton. Also shown are phytoplankton and protozooplankton (protozoan plankton) as representatives of protists, and mesozooplankton as direct metazoan consumers. The yellow lines indicate trophic interactions, whereas the black lines indicate other physicochemical processes.
