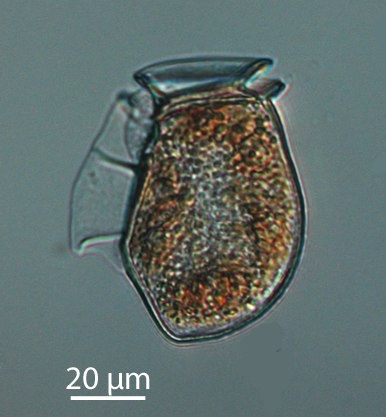

Scientific classification
- Domain: Eukaryota
- Clade: Diaphoretickes
- Clade: Sar
- Clade: Alveolata
- Phylum: Dinoflagellata
- Class: Dinophyceae
- Order: Dinophysiales
- Family: Dinophysaceae
- Genus: Dinophysis
- Species: D. acuta

Binomial name
- Dinophysis acuta Ehrenberg

= Dinophysis acuta =

Species of dinoflagellate

Dinophysis acuta is a species of flagellated planktons belonging to the genus Dinophysis. It is one of the few unusual photosynthetic protists that acquire plastids from algae by endosymbiosis. By forming massive blooms, particularly in late summer and spring, it causes red tides. It produces toxic substances and the red tides cause widespread infection of seafood, particularly crabs and mussels. When infected animals are consumed, severe diarrhoea occurs. The clinical symptom is called diarrhetic shellfish poisoning. The main chemical toxins were identified in 2006 as okadaic acid and pectenotoxins. They can produce non-fatal or fatal amounts of toxins in their predators, which can become toxic to humans.

== Description ==
Dinophysis acuta is a marine unicellular protist, and is the largest among Dinophysis. It is an armoured species with a distinct body covering called theca or test. The body is laterally compressed with a small, cap-like epitheca and a much larger hypotheca. It has the double collars (known as cingulum) around the top of the cell, and a further wing (known as the sulcus) running vertically down the cell. It is oblong in shape with almost entirely rounded posterior end, but the tip of the end is slightly pointed. The size ranges from 54 to 94 μm in length and 43 to 60 μm in dorso-ventral width, with the widest region below the middle. The small epitheca is composed of four plates. It is low, flat or weakly convex, and is invisible in lateral view, which is a good identifying feature. The sulcus consists of several irregularly-shaped plates, and it contains the flagellar pore. The hypotheca has four large plates that constitute the majority of the cell. The anterior two-thirds of the hypotheca has convex margins, while the posterior third forms a broad asymmetrical triangle with a straight dorsal edge, and occasionally a slightly concave ventral edge. Reproduction is by simple binary fission. The most unusual cellular structure is the presence of numerous reddish-yellow chloroplasts, which are derived from its prey, which in turn had acquired from algae.

== Diarrhetic shellfish poisoning ==
The first cases of diarrhetic shellfish poisoning (DSP) due to D. acuta were recorded in 1972 in Peru, but were reported to the scientific community only in 1991. It is a mildest form of seafood poisoning, indicated by severe diarrhoea. The first toxins isolated from the species were pectenotoxins (PTX-2 and PTX-11) in 2003 from specimens collected from the west coast of South Island, New Zealand, and PTX-12 independently at Skjer, Sognefjorden in Norway. In 2004, the presence of okadaic acid esters was reported. Further identification and the importance of these compounds as causal factors of DSP were discovered in 2006.
