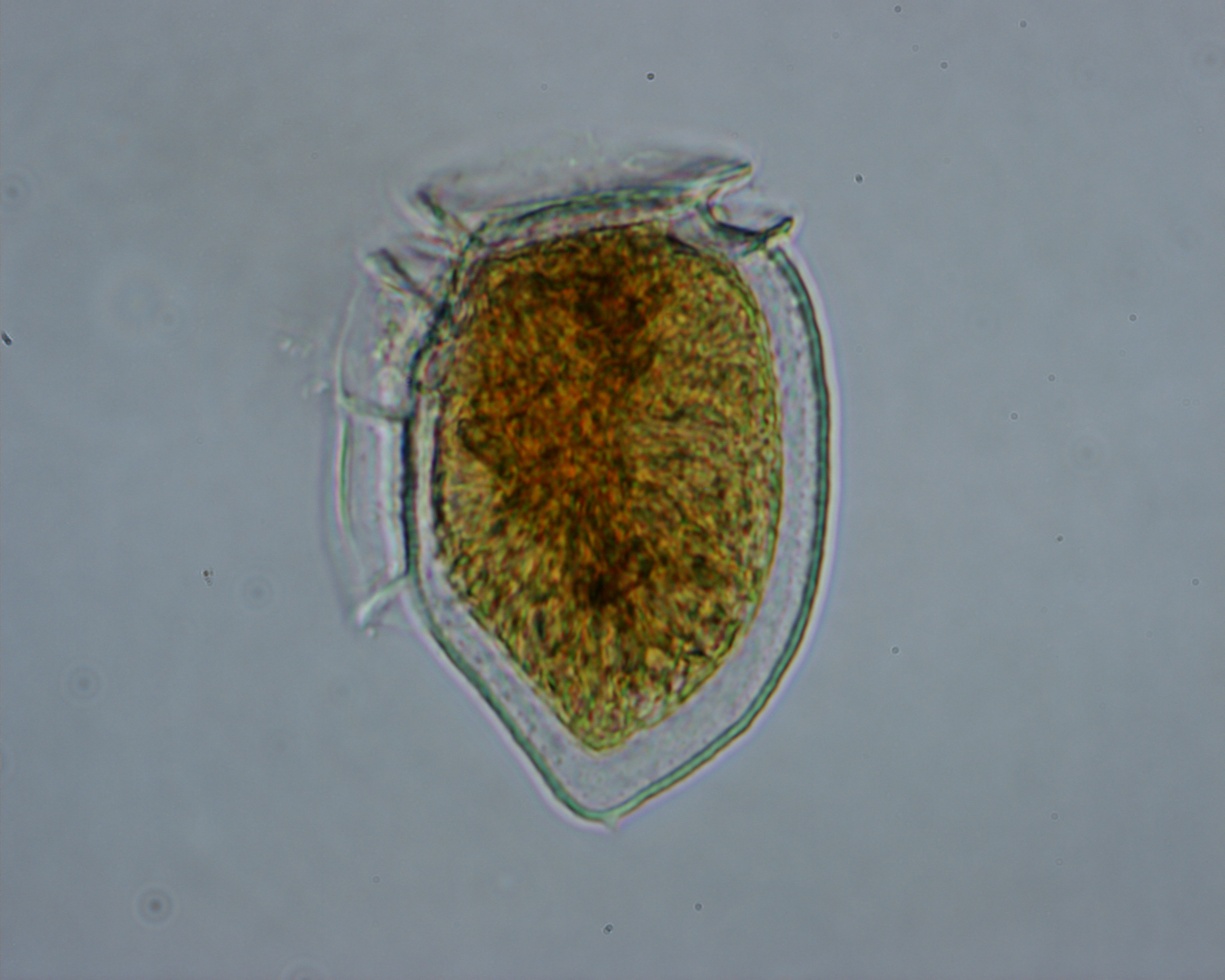

Scientific classification
- Domain: Eukaryota
- Clade: Diaphoretickes
- Clade: SAR
- Clade: Alveolata
- Phylum: Myzozoa
- Superclass: Dinoflagellata
- Class: Dinophyceae
- Order: Dinophysiales
- Family: Dinophysaceae
- Genus: Dinophysis
- Species: D. norvegica

Binomial name
- Dinophysis norvegica Claparède & J.Lachm.

= Dinophysis norvegica =

Species of single-celled organism

Dinophysis norvegica is a species of dinoflagellate most commonly associated with diarrheal shellfish poisoning.
