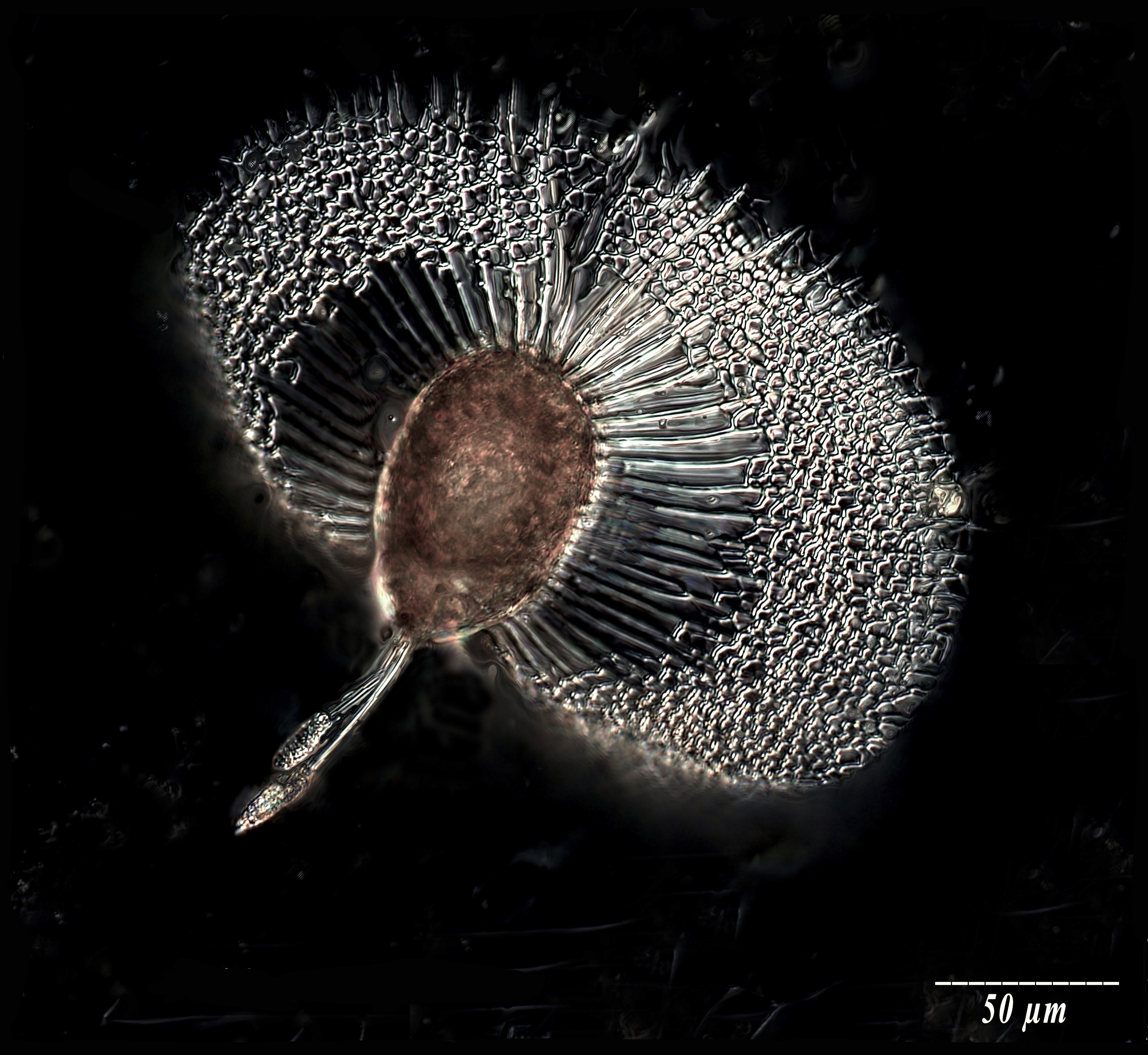
- Ornithocercus splendidus at 74 m in the Ionian Sea

Scientific classification
- Domain: Eukaryota
- Clade: Sar
- Clade: Alveolata
- Division: Dinoflagellata
- Class: Dinophyceae
- Order: Dinophysiales
- Family: Dinophysaceae
- Genus: Ornithocercus; Stein

Species
- Ornithocercus australis Wood, 1963; Ornithocercus bilobatus Rampi; Ornithocercus carolinae Kofoid; Ornithocercus carpentariae Wood; Ornithocercus cristatus Matzenauer; Ornithocercus formosus Kofoid & Michener; Ornithocercus francescae (Murray) Balech; Ornithocercus geniculatus Dangeard; Ornithocercus heteroporoides Abé; Ornithocercus heteroporus Kofoid; Ornithocercus magnificus Stein; Ornithocercus quadratus Schütt; Ornithocercus skogsbergii Abé; Ornithocercus splendidus Schütt; Ornithocercus steinii Schütt; Ornithocercus thumii (Schmidt) Kofoid & Skogsberg; Ornithocercus thurnii (Schmidt) Kofoid & Skogsberg; Ornithocercus assimilis Jørgensen; Ornithocercus biclavatus E.J.F.Wood; Ornithocercus galea (Pouchet) Abé; Ornithocercus minor Jørgensen; Ornithocercus orbiculatus Kofoid & Michener; Ornithocercus serratus Kofoid; Ornithocercus triclavatus E.F.J.Wood

= Ornithocercus =

Genus of single-celled organisms

Ornithocercus is a genus of planktonic dinoflagellate that is known for its complex morphology that features considerable lists growing from its thecal plates, giving an attractive appearance. Discovered in 1883, this genus has a small number of species currently categorized but is widespread in tropical and sub-tropical oceans. The genus is marked by exosymbiotic bacteria gardens under its lists, the inter-organismal dynamics of which are a current field of research. As they reside only in warm water, the genus has been used as a proxy for climate change and has potential to be an indicator species for environmental change if found in novel environments.

== History of knowledge ==
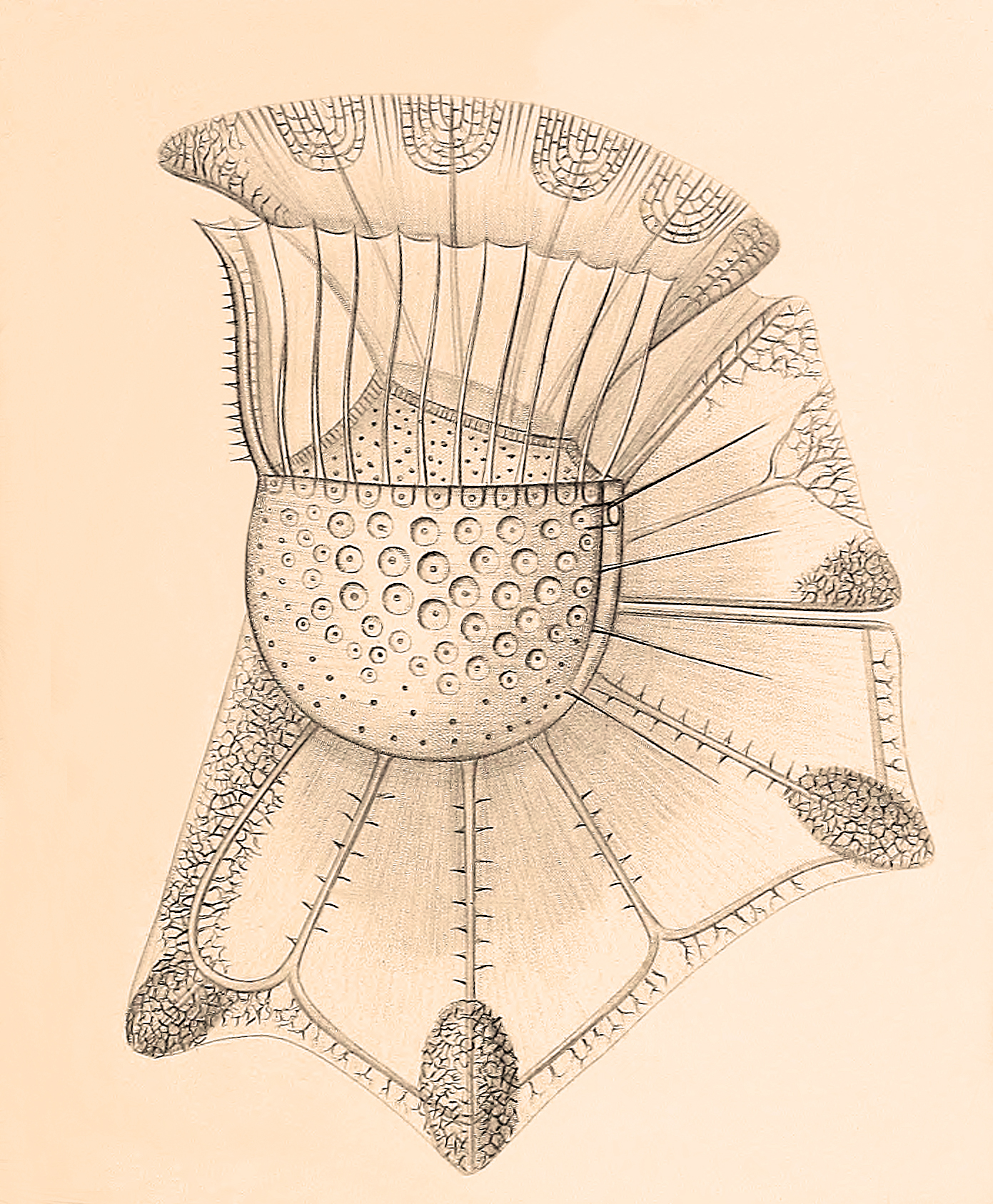
Ornithocercus Magnificus: From the original 1867 species description

“…Ornithocercus, [so] strange, even the most sober researcher will have [to give] some admiration … Ornithocercus magnificus, one of the most wonderful and strangest animal forms that ever happened to me” – Friedich Stein 1883

The genus Ornithocercus was first described in 1883 by German entomologist and zoologist Samuel Friedrich Nathaniel Ritter von Stein. He coined the genus with originally only one species: the holotype Ornithocercus magnificus. He made his observations in the Atlantic Ocean and named the organism with regards to the wonder its form inspired in him.

Stein originally grouped Ornithocercus in the Dinophysiden, a German taxonomic term that is no longer utilized. He specifically paired it with the genus Histioneis due to their morphological distinctiveness including what he described as a head-funnel and neck collar.

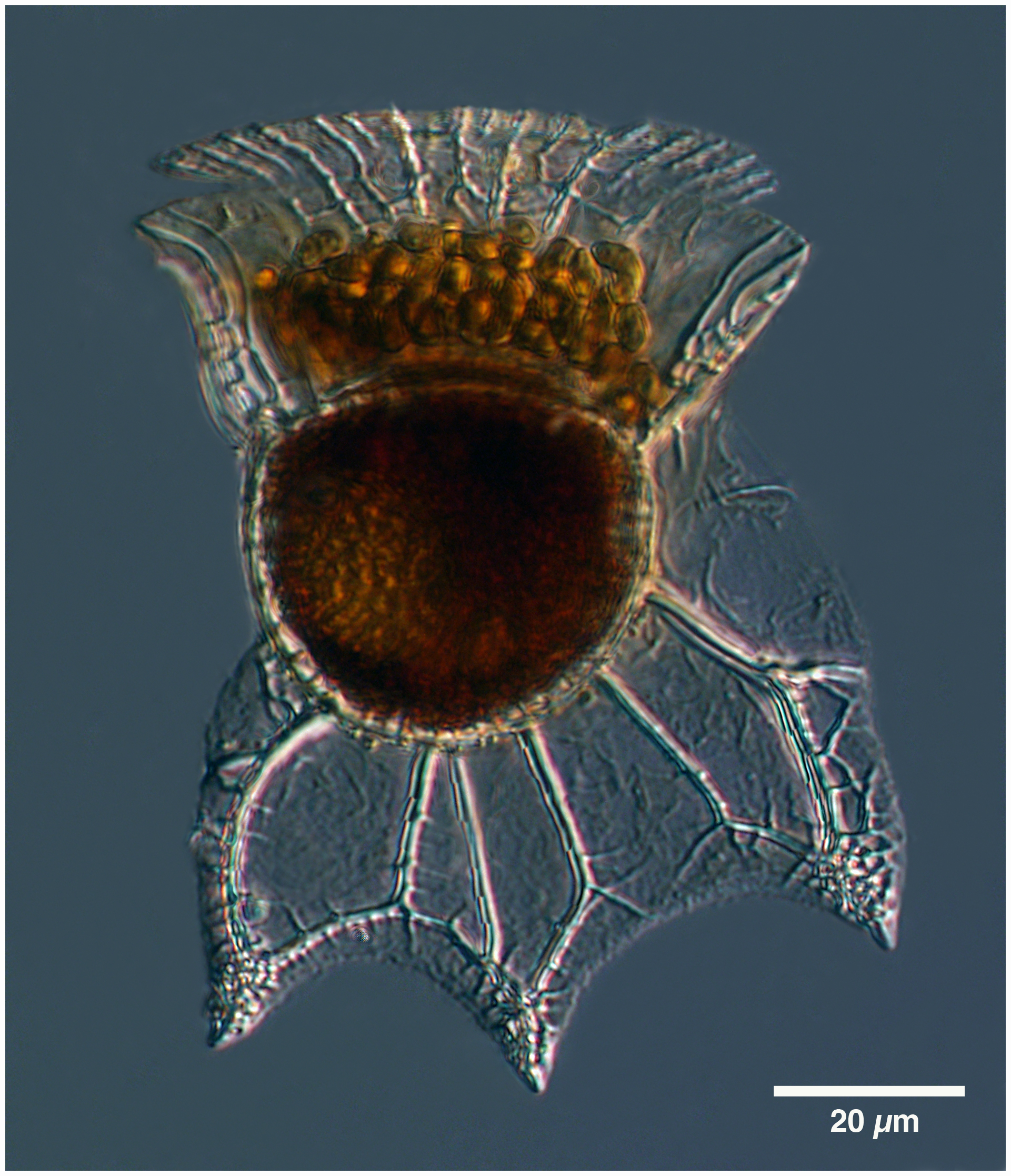
Ornithocercus magnificus from the Bay of Villefranche. The little orange balls are symbiotic cyanobacteria.

Until DNA barcoding became accessible, specific demarcation in the genus was a significant challenge due to the variability in morphological traits (specifically the cingular lists). While beautiful figures were published in the early 20th century, often their scientific value was limited due to the incompleteness of morphological analyses. Although the most fundamental taxonomic feature was the thecal structure, relatively few papers were available before the 1970s that critically analyzed thecal plates. Several works reported the number of plates incorrectly. A review of previous publications and update with novel research published by Tohru Abe in 1967 indicated morphological features had been previously misinterpreted and given unwarranted significance taxonomically.

Availability of enhanced microscope technology allowed greater morphological understanding. Scanning electron microscopes gave greater clarity to surface features as well as revealing the dissimilarity between inner and outer surfaces (such as pore openings) while transmission electron microscopes allowed insights into cell wall development. The study of morphological variability within Ornithocercus species is an ongoing field. A 2018 study found that species O. quadratus could be three separate morphospecies based on inferences from modern imaging techniques of morphology.

The genus is not as diverse as other dinoflagellate genera such as Dinophysis but does have at least 24 recognized species. It has been extensively studied around the world, with species found to inhabit waters including the North Arabian Sea, Eastern Tropical Pacific, Indian Ocean, Red Sea, Vitiaz Strait, Caribbean Sea, Gulf of Aden, Southern Ocean, Boeton Str, California Current, Gulf of Mexico, Panamic Area, Peruvian Current Galapagos Eddy, and the coast of the Korean Peninsula.

== Habitat and ecology ==
Species of Ornithocercus are found in tropical and subtropical oceans, limited to warm temperature-waters. Tropical waters are home to many genera of dinophysoid, the most common of which is the Ornithocercus with O. quadratus being the most widely distributed species. They are common in deep oceanic waters, with many species found predominantly below the euphotic zone.

The existence of Ornithocercus in a brackish lagoon was also found in Terengganu at Gong Batu lagoon in Malaysia, indicating that it is not an isolated phenomenon.

== Morphology ==
Species range in length from 40-170 μm. They are therefore classed as microplankton.

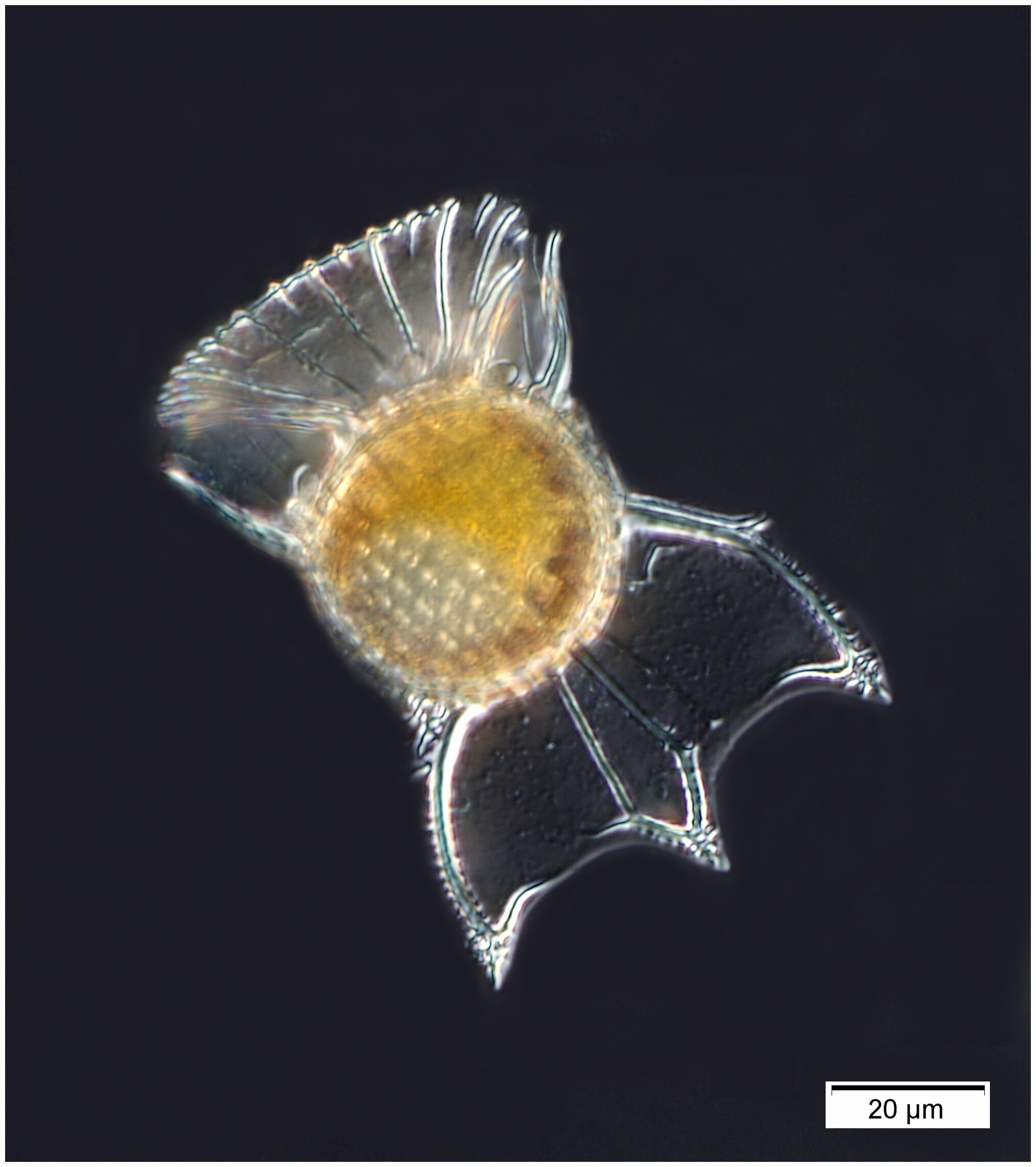
Ornithocercus heteroporus - prominent lists on display

Ornithocercus is a thecate dinoflagellate. This means they are armored with overlapping cellulose plates collectively called a theca. The plates form within alveoli and therefore the wall is found within the cell membrane. Lists are rigid outgrowths from edges of specific thecal plates supported by ribs. The ribs vary in number and development between species (the number of ribs is species specific) and are necessary for expansive list growth. The theca consists of 17 or 18 plates which are divided into epithecal, hypothecal, girdle, and ventral area. The theca are divisible into left and right sides longitudinally by a sagittal suture; there is also a latitudinal girdle. Structurally complex, the genus is characterized by possession of extensive girdle and sulcal lists (wing-like extensions of the cell wall). Their theca have numerous pores which open flush to the surface of the plate on the outside but have a raised rim on the inside, their number being positively correlated with cell size. The hypotheca of most species are covered in areolae (shallow depressions) which are deepened by secondary thickening which takes place in mature cells. While hypotheca of some Histioneis can be embedded in mucus, Ornithocercus species have not been observed with a hypotheca associated mucus layer.

The elaborate morphology of the genus is thought to be a disadvantage during active swimming . The lists have been posited to function in stability and creating feeding currents. The typical flagellar propulsion of dinoflagellates would be resisted by their morphology and the differences in list development between sides could act as a keel. The inhibition of rotation provided by their thecae would lead to increased water flow over parts of the cell which could enhance their feeding-current system. One study found that the area in contact with the highest volume of external medium due to water flow is also a region where there are markedly less barriers to nutrient transfer (two less membranes - including theca).

By comparing extant morphologies in dinoflagellate species, it has been suggested that ancestral species were benthic and had streamlined cells. As lifestyles became more planktonic, the large cingular and sulcal lists evolved alongside.

Rhabdosomes, rod-shaped bodies found in the cytoplasm (approximately 3 μm in length and 0.25 μm), have been observed in Ornithocercus species. They’re thought to function in prey capture as trichocysts although no signs of emission have ever been observed. The observation of a cytosome with a microtubular strand was used as evidence of potential food uptake via the peduncle.

== Feeding and symbiosis ==
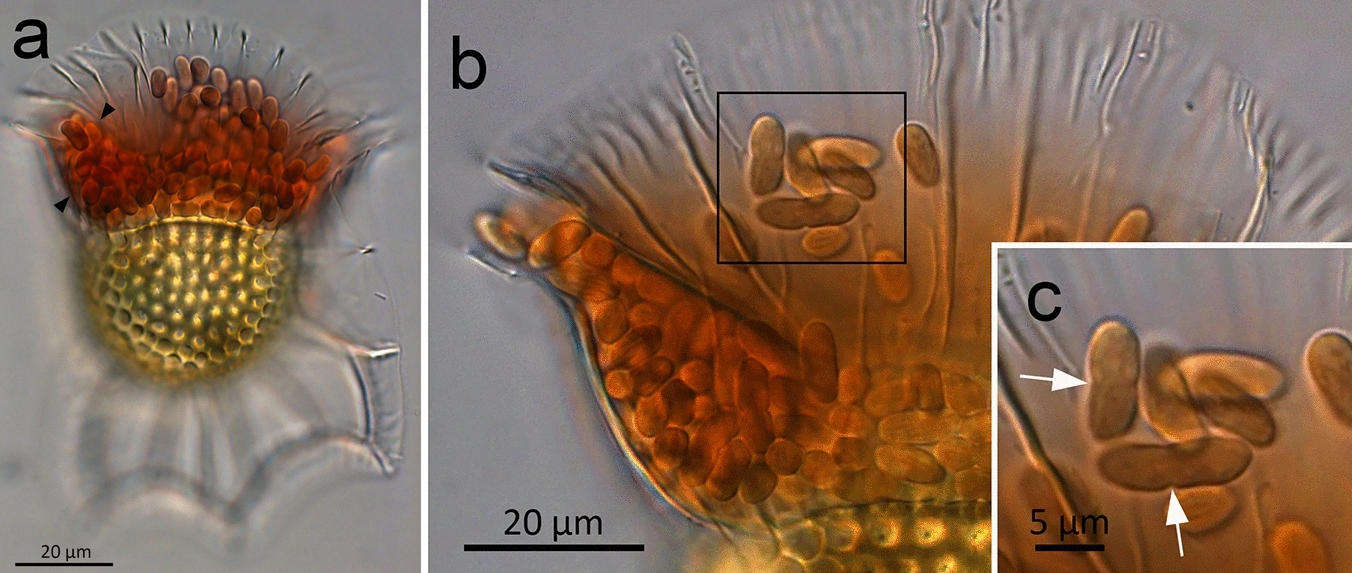
Cyanobionts of Ornithocercus dinoflagellates Live cyanobionts (cyanobacterial symbionts) belonging to Ornithocercus dinoflagellate host consortium (a) O. magnificus with numerous cyanobionts present in the upper and lower girdle lists (black arrowheads) of the cingulum termed the symbiotic chamber. (b) O. steinii with numerous cyanobionts inhabiting the symbiotic chamber. (c) Enlargement of the area in (b) showing two cyanobionts that are being divided by binary transverse fission (white arrows).

Ornithocercus lacks photosynthetic pigments (and chloroplasts) and they are thus obligate heterotrophs. Along with other heterotrophic dinoflagellate genera, they were thought to exclusively feed through osmotrophy of dissolved organic manner.

While lacking the ability to photosynthesize, Ornithocercus has ectosymbiotic (extracellular) cyanobacteria. The cyanobacterial symbionts known as phaeosomes are located between the upper and lower lists of the horizontal groove of the cells. One study of these cyanobacteria symbiotes found that the cell size ranged from 3.5-10 μm (thus approximately an order of magnitude larger than prevalent planktonic Synechococcus forms). A 2010 study found species to house both the described extracellular cyanobacteria as well as larger rod-shaped non-photosynthetic bacteria on their sulcal lists.

The exact mechanism through which photosynthetic products of the bacteria are utilized by the host is still unclear. A 1994 study was conducted in the Gulf of Aqaba in which levels of colonial cyanobacteria were measured alongside oceanic nitrogen levels. Detection and peaking numbers of the consortia of heterotrophs (Ornithocercus) and autotrophs (cyanobacteria) at times of nitrogen limitation led the authors to propose that the hosts may be providing an anaerobic microenvironment in which the cyanobacteria can efficiently fix nitrogen. This hypothetically could allow the consortia to thrive in stratified oligotrophic nitrogen limited waters. Recent studies called into question this conjecture as the cyanobacteria on two species of Ornithocercus were not found to produce the necessary enzyme nitrogenase. The bacteria thus may provide fixed carbon for the host or may be used as a direct source of nutrients when they die. Another study found that Ornithocercus has a nitrogenase gene (nifH) which supports the idea of additional nitrogen fixing heterotrophic symbionts, allowing the possibility that the bacterial garden hosted by Ornithocercus provides fixed carbon and nitrogen for the host.

Food vacuoles have been observed inside O. magnificus with remnants of cyanobacterial symbionts enclosed. In one study, some of the numerous food vacuoles observed inside Ornithocercus species strongly resembled the ectosymbionts in size and colour but were too degraded by section preparation to confirm via transmission electron microscopy. The authors nonetheless concluded that it seemed likely the Ornithocercus were in effect growing their own “vegetables” and likely consuming the bacteria via a peduncle. They also found evidence that Ornithocercus may ingest ciliates, thus engaging in a multi-resource strategy to survive oligotrophic waters.

An analysis of the genome of cyanobacteria associated with O. magnificus found that it had a reduced genome when compared to free-living cyanobacteria. This indicates it had lost some genes as functions were provided for it by the host. However, its genome reduction was less severe than that seen in other cyanobacterial symbionts. Therefore it was proposed that the cyanobacteria is not dependent on the host for critical functions such as metabolism, thus supporting the theory that Ornithocercus feeds on its “garden” of bacteria.

== Life cycle ==
Ornithocercus grows by increasing the size of the individual cell wall elements slowly over time. It also undergoes a period of rapid expansion laterally during cell division (binary fission). The cell division growth is preceded by the formation of a band of material known as the megacytic zone which allows the mother cell wall to maintain integrity during cytokinesis as new cell wall pieces are duplicated. This zone grows between the left and right sides of the theca. The genus’ characteristic lists are reformed only after dissolution of the megacytic zone. The last attachment between daughter cells is dorsally located and some species maintain attachment during early list development.

It has been suggested that the hydrodynamic properties of lists are a reason that cells maintain contact after cell division. As division leads to initially underdeveloped lists, by remaining together, the potential negative effects of lacking lists on stability and nutrition (assuming that is their normal function) could be reduced as they develop.

Like other dinoflagellate genera, Ornithocercus has been found to show phased cell division (specific dividing times for species throughout the day). By analyzing the states of the megacytic zones and bridges between daughter cells, a study off the coast of Brazil in the South Atlantic Ocean found that while cell division in O. steinii required high light intensity, O. magnificus and O. thumii utilized the days first light.

Sexual reproduction and cyst formation are not known in Ornithocercus.

== Phylogeny ==
In the early 20th century, radiation schemes based on morphologies in cell structure were created for the order Dinophysiales (Dinophyceae) and were followed up with subsequent attempts utilizing more ecological and morphological data. Recently, molecular phylogenetic studies have been undertaken which provide more accurate hypothetical frameworks for dinophysoid character evolution. A 2009 paper placed Ornithocercus in a group with Citharistes sharing a common ancestor but had insufficient data to label Ornithocercus as a monophyletic group (concluding however that it was a reasonable assumption that it is a monophyletic genus based on morphological similarities and sequence divergence estimates). Another contemporary investigation including representative data for the genus Ornithocercus determined that it was in fact monophyletic.

A 2013 study summarized the state of potential Ornithocercus phylogeny and placed them in clade with Citharistes and Histioneis with which the ectosymbiontic feature is shared. This indicates that a common ancestor of these genera likely gained this relationship with cyanobacteria. Both Ornithocercus and Histioneis have cyanobacteria living between cingular lists whereas Citharistes have their ectosymbionts in a dorsal girdle-chamber.

== Practical importance ==
In 2008 a study was published in which temporal changes in dinoflagellate composition in coastal waters off the Korean Peninsula were analyzed. They found tropical oceanic species of Ornithocercus which were previously rare or unrecorded around the Peninsula. A follow-up study in 2013 confirmed the presence of numerous tropical dinoflagellate species including several species of Ornithocercus. Together, the studies confirmed changes in phytoplankton communities in Korean waters by identifying dinoflagellate species changes, with the second paper both verifying the first and widening the scope of the changes. The authors suggest that these trends could be a result of increasing sea surface temperatures due to global warming. As such, Ornithocercus species could be used as indicator species and evidence for climate change and specifically marine ecosystem change if coupled with other environmental data.

The Indian oil sardine (Sardinella longiceps) is one of the most important commercial fishes in India. These fish are known to occasionally feed heavily on Ornithocercus, specifically in the demersal zone (the study was performed off Mangalore). As such, the welfare of Ornithocercus as a food chain link has commercial implications.
