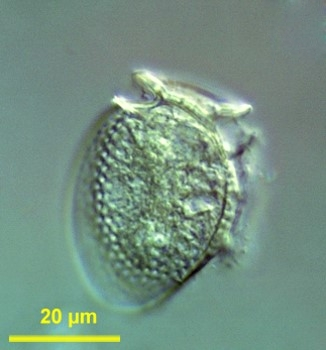
- Formalin fixed sample, collected from sampling station 7, North Sea

Scientific classification
- Domain: Eukaryota
- Clade: Sar
- Clade: Alveolata
- Phylum: Dinoflagellata
- Class: Dinophyceae
- Order: Dinophysiales
- Family: Dinophysaceae
- Genus: Dinophysis
- Species: D. acuminata

Binomial name
- Dinophysis acuminata Claparède & Lachmann

= Dinophysis acuminata =

Species of dinoflagellate

Dinophysis acuminata is a marine plankton species of dinoflagellates that is found in coastal waters of the north Atlantic and Pacific oceans. The genus Dinophysis includes both phototrophic and heterotrophic species. D. acuminata is one of several phototrophic species of Dinophysis classed as toxic, as they produce okadaic acid which can cause diarrhetic shellfish poisoning (DSP). Okadiac acid is taken up by shellfish and has been found in the soft tissue of mussels and the liver of flounder species. When contaminated animals are consumed, they cause severe diarrhoea. D. acuminata blooms are constant threat to and indication of diarrhoeatic shellfish poisoning outbreaks.

Dinophysis acuminata is a photosynthesising Dinophysis species by acquiring secondary plastids from consuming the ciliate Myrionecta rubra, which in turn had ingested them from the alga Teleaulax amphioxeia. Thus, D. acuminata is a mixotroph, primarily a heterotroph, but autotroph once it acquires plastids. This is also an example of cell organelle stealing, the concept called kleptoplasty, and endosymbiosis. Dinophysis acuminata reproduces sexually and asexually.

== Description ==
Dinophysis acuminata is an oval-shaped protist. It measures 30-35 μm in length and 38-58 μm in diameter. The body is reddish-brown in colour and is covered with an armor-like covering called theca, which is made up of grass. The anterior end has a crown-like platform, which is the smaller epitheca; while the posterior is simply rounded constituting a larger hypotheca. The cell has two flagella for locomotion. Reproduction is by simple binary fission. In lateral view D. acuminata cells are irregularly egg-shaped, dorsally convex and have large hypothecal plates with a more or less oval shape. The dorsal contour is always more strongly convex than the ventral one. Compared to other species of Dinophysis, D. acuminata has a more straight ventral margin and larger left sulcal lists with more prominent ribs. The nucleus is prominently at the centre of the cell. The unusual feature of the cell is that it contains reddish-brown chloroplast.

The taxonomic identification of Dinophysis species is largely based on cell contouring, size and shape of their large hypothecal plates and the shape of their left sulcal lists and ribs. When viewed laterally species in the Dinophysis are laterally compressed with a cap-like epitheca and a much larger hypotheca although the size and shape of these species varies greatly due to their polymorphic life cycle. Due to the morphological variability of Dinophysis species identification can be hard, especially when two species (D. acuminata and D. sacculus) co-exist. For this reason the term "D. acuminata complex" was coined to label a group of co-existing species difficult to discriminate.

=== Dinophysis morphology ===
Dinophysis acuminata can be very hard to identify, and requires careful observations[3]. It can be identified by its midsection[1]. It is very large (38-55μm) and wide (30-38μm) in the middle unlike D. norvegica that is 34-50μm long and 36-43μm wide[2]. The Dinophysis norvegica is smaller and widest in the middle region[1]. D. norvegica and D. acuminata are a very similar species as a result, they exhibits similar behaviors and are commonly misidentified[1]. Furthermore, other ways to identify D. acuminata from other Dinophysis species can be done by comparison of the left sulcal list (cellulose extensions of the cell[5]) and LSL identification in ribs[1].Cells have convex dorsal margins and small oval shaped cells and their thecal plates are covered with areolae (circular depression on the cellulose wall of a dinoflagellate[5]) each with a pore[4]. Continuously, the knob-shaped protrusions and round antapex (botton end of a dinoflagellate[5]) are ways to identify D.acuminata[4].

== Feeding and endosymbiosis ==
Dinophysis acuminata is basically a heterotroph feeding on the ciliate Mesodinium rubrum. M. rubrum in turn feeds on green algae that contain plastids. (The endosymbiont is used by the ciliate for its own photosynthesis.) Microscopic observations of live cells using established cultures revealed that D. acuminata uses a peduncle, extending from the flagellar pore, to extract the cell contents of the marine ciliate M. rubrum. After about 1 minute the trapped M. rubrum becomes immobile after which the D. acuminata slowly consumes the ciliate, over 1–2 hours, filling its vacuoles with the ciliate's cytoplasm. The algal plastids are not destroyed by D. acuminata but use it for its own photosynthesis, thereby becoming an autotroph. However, unlike its prey M. rubum, it is not clear whether D. acuminata uses the plastids permanently or temporarily. Food vacuoles found in the vacuoles of this primitive genus indicates that organisms in this genus are mixotrophs especially D. norvegica[1]. Mixotrophy is the ability of an organism to use different sources of carbon and energy instead of having a single mode of feeding (autotroph or heterotroph). However, certain species related to Dinophysis acuminata prefer one mode of feeding over another. Dinophysis rotundata uses myzocytosis to feed [1]. Their mixotrophic conditions and size are influenced by prey populations and hydrographic conditions [2].

== Ecology and current threats of Dinophysis ==
Dinophysis acuminata has caused several problems in oceanic ecosystems. The main cause of DSP, diarrhetic shellfish poisoning, outbreaks in waters along Europe has been due to this species[3]. Likewise, the close knit sisters of Dinophysis acuminata called Dinophysis norvegica, a photosynthetic organism with yellow chloroplast and posterior nucleus, Dinophysis acuta, and Dinophysis fortii have also been known to cause the same problems as D. acuminata[1]. Dinophysis norvegica is a marine plankton dinoflagellate that is found in neritic waters[1]. This species of the Dinophysis genus is a bloom-forming toxic species[1]. Both species reproduce asexually by binary fission to make identical copies of itself[1]. Speculations of sexual dimorphism that is the difference between the female and male counterparts have allowed researchers to draw conclusion that species of this genus can undergo sexual reproduction[1]. The first record of DSP with Dinophysis acuminata and Dinophysis fortii was in 1980 in the Patagonian coast[4]. A year after the report, another occurrence of DSP unleashed in December 1993 and November 1994[4]. Dinophysis acuminata releases lipophilic shellfish toxins (LSTs) and have been found to cause trouble to ecological marines and aquaculture farmers[2]'. The lipophilic toxins accumulate in shellfishes and causes diarrhea and shellfish poisoning to consumers. Dinophysis acuminata is the cause of DSP in Brazil and creates a disturbing impact due to its long and early blooming species[4]. However, their presence is restricted around the spring and summer[4], but in higher concentrations in December. DSP is a particular kind food poisoning that causes severe gastrointestinal illness in humans and this is related to the ingestion of toxin contaminated shellfishes from contaminated water[4]. Some of the symptoms of DSP include diarrhea, stomach pain, vomiting, nausea and fever; reported human ingestion shows that the toxins are capable of causing stomach tumors and chronic problems to consumers[4]. Government involvement as a result of high concentrations of toxins in the Dinophysis toxic shellfish epidemic has caused economic crisis in Europe and the aquaculture industry'[2]'.
