= Cyanobiont =

Symbiotic bacterium

Cyanobionts are cyanobacteria that live in symbiosis with a wide range of organisms such as terrestrial or aquatic plants; as well as algal and fungal species. They can reside within extracellular or intracellular structures of the host. In order for a cyanobacterium to successfully form a symbiotic relationship, it must be able to exchange signals with the host, overcome defense mounted by the host, be capable of hormogonia formation, chemotaxis, heterocyst formation, as well as possess adequate resilience to reside in host tissue which may present extreme conditions, such as low oxygen levels, and/or acidic mucilage. The most well-known plant-associated cyanobionts belong to the genus Nostoc. With the ability to differentiate into several cell types that have various functions, members of the genus Nostoc have the morphological plasticity, flexibility and adaptability to adjust to a wide range of environmental conditions, contributing to its high capacity to form symbiotic relationships with other organisms. Several cyanobionts involved with fungi and marine organisms also belong to the genera Richelia, Calothrix, Synechocystis, Aphanocapsa and Anabaena, as well as the species Oscillatoria spongeliae. Although there are many documented symbioses between cyanobacteria and marine organisms, little is known about the nature of many of these symbioses. The possibility of discovering more novel symbiotic relationships is apparent from preliminary microscopic observations.

Currently, cyanobionts have been found to form symbiosis with various organisms in marine environments such as diatoms, dinoflagellates, sponges, protozoans, Ascidians, Acadians, and Echiuroid worms, many of which have significance in maintaining the biogeochemistry of both open ocean and coastal waters. Specifically, symbioses involving cyanobacteria are mostly mutualistic, in which the cyanobionts are responsible for nutrient provision to the host in exchange for attaining high structural-functional specialization. Most cyanobacteria-host symbioses are found in oligotrophic areas where limited nutrient availability may limit the ability of the hosts to acquire carbon (DOC), in the case of heterotrophs and nitrogen in the case of phytoplankton, although a few occur in nutrient-rich areas such as mudflats.

== Role in symbiosis ==
Cyanobionts play a variety of roles in their symbiotic relationships with the host organism. They function primarily as nitrogen- and carbon-fixers. However, they can also be involved in metabolite exchange, as well as in provision of UV protection to their symbiotic partners, since some can produce nitrogen-containing compounds with sunscreen-like properties, such as scytonemin and amino acids similar to mycosporin.

By entering into a symbiosis with nitrogen-fixing cyanobacteria, organisms that otherwise cannot inhabit low-nitrogen environments are provided with adequate levels of fixed nitrogen to carry out life functions. Providing nitrogen is a common role of cyanobionts in many symbiotic relationships, especially in those with photosynthetic hosts. Formation of an anaerobic envelope (heterocyst) to prevent nitrogenase from being irreversibly damaged in the presence of oxygen is an important strategy employed by nitrogen-fixing cyanobacteria to carry out fixation of di-nitrogen in the air, via nitrogenase, into organic nitrogen that can be used by the host. To keep up with the large nitrogen demand of both the symbiotic partner and itself, cyanobionts fix nitrogen at a higher rate, as compared to their free-living counterparts, by increasing the frequency of heterocyst formation.

Cyanobacteria are also photosynthetically active and can therefore meet carbon requirements independently. In symbioses involving cyanobacteria, at least one of the partners must be photoautotrophic in order to generate sufficient amounts of carbon for the mutualistic system. This role is usually allocated to cyanobionts in symbiotic relationships with non-photosynthetic partners such as marine invertebrates.

== Maintenance of successful symbioses ==
In order to maintain a successful symbiosis following host infection, cyanobacteria need to match their life cycles with those of their hosts'. In other words, cyanobacterial cell division must be done at a rate matching their host in order to divide at similar times. As free living organisms, cyanobacteria typically divide more frequently compared to eukaryotic cells, but as symbionts, cyanobionts slow down division times so they do not overwhelm their host. It is unknown how cyanobionts are able to adjust their growth rates, but it is not a result of nutrient limitation by the host. Instead, cyanobionts appear to limit their own nutrient uptake in order to delay cell division, while the excess nutrients are diverted to the host for uptake.

As the host continues to grow and reproduce, the cyanobiont will continue to infect and replicate in the new cells. This is known as vertical transmission, where new daughter cells of the host will be quickly infected by the cyanobionts in order to maintain their symbiotic relationship. This is most commonly seen when hosts reproduce asexually. In the water fern Azolla, cyanobacteria colonize the cavities within dorsal leaves. As new leaves form and begin to grow, the new leaf cavities that develop will quickly become colonized by new incoming cyanobacteria.

An alternative mode of transmission is known as horizontal transmission, where hosts acquire new cyanobacteria from the surrounding environment between each host generation. This mode of transmission is commonly seen when hosts reproduce sexually, as it tends to increase the genetic diversity of both host and cyanobiont. Hosts that use horizontal transmission in order to obtain cyanobacteria will typically acquire a large and diverse cyanobiont population. This may be used as a survival strategy in open oceans as indiscriminate uptake of cyanobacteria may guarantee capture of appropriate cyanobionts for each successive generation.

== Genetic modifications within host ==
Following infection and establishment of an endosymbiotic relationship, the new cyanobionts will no longer be free living and autonomous, but rather begin to dedicate their physiological activities in tandem with their hosts'. Over time and evolution, the cyanobiont will begin to lose portions of their genome in a process known as genome erosion. As the relationship between the cyanobacteria and host evolves, the cyanobiont genome will develop signs of degradation, particularly in the form of pseudogenes. A genome undergoing reduction will typically have a large proportion of pseudogenes and transposable elements dispersed throughout the genome. Furthermore, cyanobacteria involved in symbiosis will begin to accumulate these mutations in specific genes, particularly those involved in DNA repair, glycolysis, and nutrient uptake. These gene sets are critical for organisms that live independently, however as cyanobionts living in symbiosis with their hosts, there may not be any evolutionary need to continue maintaining the integrity of these genes. As the major function of a cyanobiont is to provide their host with fixed nitrogen, genes involved in nitrogen fixation or cell differentiation are observed to remain relatively untouched. This may suggest that cyanobacteria involved in symbiotic relationships can selectively stream line their genetic information in order to best perform their functions as cyanobiont-host relationships continue to evolve over time.

== Examples of symbioses ==
Cyanobacteria have been documented to form symbioses with a large range of eukaryotes in both marine and terrestrial environments. Cyanobionts provide benefit through dissolved organic carbon (DOC) production or nitrogen fixation but vary in function depending on their host. Organisms that depend on cyanobacteria often live in nitrogen-limited, oligotrophic environments and can significantly alter marine composition leading to blooms.

=== Diatoms ===
Commonly found in oligotrophic environments, diatoms within the genera Hemiaulus and Rhizosolenia form symbiotic associations with filamentous cyanobacteria in the species Richelia intracellularis. As an endophyte in up to 12 species of Rhizosolenia, R. intracellularis provides fixed nitrogen to its host via the terminally-located heterocyst. Richella-Rhizosolenia symbioses have been found to be abundant within the nitrogen-limited waters of the Central-Pacific Gyre. Several field studies have linked the occurrence of phytoplankton blooms within the gyre to an increase in nitrogen fixation from Richella-Rhizosolenia symbiosis. A dominant organism in warm oligotrophic waters, five species within the genus Hemiaulus receive fixed nitrogen from R. intracellularis. Hemiaulus-Richella symbioses are up to 245 times more abundant than the former, with 80–100% of Hemilalus cells containing the cyanobiont. Nitrogen fixation in the Hemiaulus-Richella symbiosis is 21 to 45 times greater than in the Richella-Rhizosolenia symbiosis within the southwestern Atlantic and Central Pacific Gyre, respectively.

Other genera of diatoms can form symbioses with cyanobacteria; however, their relationships are less known. Nitrogen fixing cyanobacterial symbionts have been found within the diatoms in the genus Epithemia and have been found to possess genes for nitrogen fixation, but have lost genes required for both photosystems and the required pigments to perform photosynthesis.

=== Dinoflagellates ===
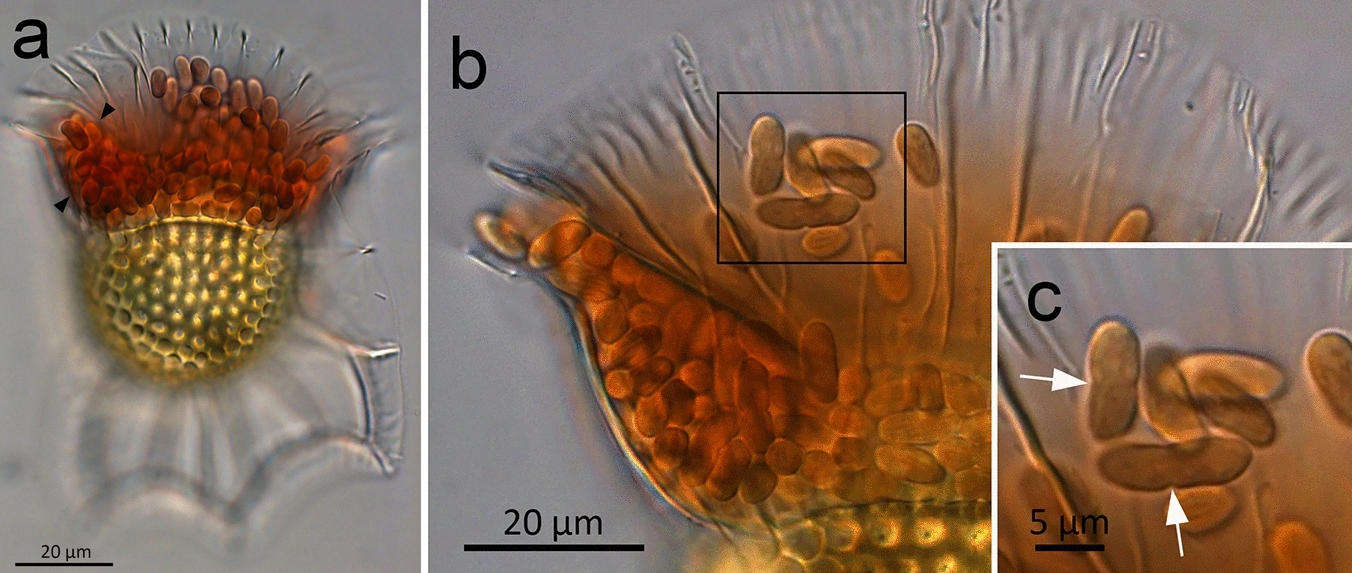
Cyanobionts of Ornithocercus dinoflagellates Live cyanobionts belonging to Ornithocercus dinoflagellate host consortium (a) O. magnificus with numerous cyanobionts present in the upper and lower girdle lists (black arrowheads) of the cingulum termed the symbiotic chamber. (b) O. steinii with numerous cyanobionts inhabiting the symbiotic chamber. (c) Enlargement of the area in (b) showing two cyanobionts that are being divided by binary transverse fission (white arrows).

Heterotrophic dinoflagellates can form symbioses with cyanobacteria (phaeosomes), most often in tropical marine environments. The function of the cyanobiont depends on its host species. Abundant marine cyanobacteria in the genus Synechococcus form symbionts with dinoflagellates in the genera Ornithocercus, Histionesis and Citharistes, where it is hypothesized to benefit its host through the provision of fixed nitrogen in oligotrophic, subtropical waters. Increased instances of phaeosome symbiosis have been documented in a stratified, nitrogen-limited environment, and living within a host can provide an anaerobic environment for nitrogen fixation to occur. However, there is conflicting evidence of this. One study on phaeosomes in cells of Ornithocercus spp. has provided evidence that symbionts belonging to the genus Synechococcus, supply organic carbon rather than nitrogen, due to the absence of nitrogenase within these cyanobacteria.

=== Sponges ===
One hundred species within the classes Calcarea and Demospongiae form symbioses with cyanobacteria in the genera Aphanocapsa, Synechocystis, Oscillatoria and Phormidium. Cyanobacteria benefit their hosts through providing glycerol and organic phosphates through photosynthesis and supply up to half of their required energy and a majority of their carbon budget. Two groups of sponges with photosynthetic symbionts have been described; these are the "cyanosponges" and "phototrophs". Cyanosponges are mixotrophic and therefore obtain energy through heterotrophic feeding as well as photosynthesis. The latter group receives almost all of their energy requirements through photosynthesis, and therefore have a larger surface area in order increase exposure to sunlight. The most common cyanobionts found in sponges belong to the genus Synechococcus with the species Candidatus Synechococcus spongiarum inhabiting a majority of symbiotic sponges within the Caribbean. Another widely distributed species of cyanobacteria Oscillatoria spongeliae is found within the sponge Lamellodysidea herbacea, alongside ten other species. Oscillatoria spongeliae benefits its host by providing carbon as well as a variety of chlorinated amino derivatives, depending on the host strain.

=== Lichens ===
Lichens are the result of a symbiosis between a mycobiont and an autotroph, usually green algae or cyanobacteria. About 8% of lichen species contain a cyanobiont, most commonly members of the genus Nostoc as well as the genera Calothrix, Scytonema and Fischerella. All cyanobionts inhabiting lichens contain heterocysts to fix nitrogen, which can be distributed throughout the host in specific regions (heteromerous) or randomly throughout the thallus (homoiomerous). Additionally, some lichen species are tripartite, containing both a cyanobacterial and green algal symbiont.

=== Bryophytes ===
Bryophytes are non-vascular plants encompassing mosses, liverworts, and hornworts, which most often form symbioses with members from the cyanobacterial genus Nostoc. Depending on the host, the cyanobiont can be inside (endophytic) or outside the host (epiphytic). In mosses, cyanobacteria are major nitrogen fixers and grow mostly epiphytically, aside from two species of Sphagnum which protect the cyanobiont from an acidic-bog environment. In terrestrial Arctic environments, cyanobionts are the primary supplier of nitrogen to the ecosystem whether free-living or epiphytic with mosses. Cyanobacterial associations with liverworts are rare, with only four of 340 genera of liverworts harbouring symbionts. Two of the genera, Marchantia and Porella, are epiphytic, while the genera Blasia and Cavicularia are endophytic. In hornworts however, endophytic cyanobionts have been described in more than triple the number of genera relative to liverworts. Bryophytes and their cyanobacterial symbionts possess different structures depending on the nature of the symbiosis. For instance, colonies of cyanobacterial symbionts in the liverwort Blasia spp. are present as auricles (small dots) between the inner and outer papillae near the ventral surface of the liverworts; whereas, cyanobionts in the hornworts Anthoceros and Phaeoceros are present within the thallus', in specialized slime cavities. However, cyanobacteria first must locate and physically interact with their host in order to form a symbiotic relationship. Members of the cyanobacterial genus Nostoc can become motile through the use of hormogonia, while the host plant excretes chemicals to guide the cyanobacteria via chemotaxis. For instance, liverworts in the genus Blasia can secrete HIF, a strong chemo-attractant for nitrogen-starved and symbiotic cyanobacteria. Cells of Nostoc punctiforme, which have been shown to possess genes encoding proteins that complement chemotaxis-related proteins within flowering plants belonging to the genus Gunnera.

=== Ascidians ===
Filamentous cyanobacteria within the genera Synechocystis and Prochloron has been found within the tunic cavity of didemnid sea squirts. The symbiosis is proposed to have originated through the intake of a combination of sand and cyanobacteria which eventually proliferated. The hosts benefit from receiving fixed carbon from the cyanobiont while the cyanobiont may benefit by protection from harsh environments.

=== Echiuroid worms ===
Little is known about the symbiotic relationship between echiuroid worms and cyanobacteria. Unspecified cyanobacteria have been found within the subepidermal connective tissue of the worms Ikedosoma gogoshimense and Bonellia fuliginosa.

=== Coral ===
Unicellular and symbiotic cyanobacteria were discovered in cells of coral belonging to the species Montastraea cavernosa from Caribbean Islands. These cyanobionts coexisted within the symbiotic dinoflagellates zooxanthellae within the corals, and produce the nitrogen-fixing enzyme nitrogenase. Details on the interaction of the symbionts with their hosts remains unknown.
