= Dinophysis ovum =

Scientific classification
- Domain: Eukaryota
- Clade: Diaphoretickes
- Clade: SAR
- Clade: Alveolata
- Phylum: Myzozoa
- Superclass: Dinoflagellata
- Class: Dinophyceae
- Order: Dinophysiales
- Family: Dinophysaceae
- Genus: Dinophysis
- Species: D. ovum

Binomial name
- Dinophysis ovum F.Schütt

Species of dinoflagellate

Dinophysis ovum is a species of toxic dinoflagellates suspected to cause diarrhetic shellfish poisoning in humans.
