= Ichthyodinium =

Scientific classification
- Domain: Eukaryota
- Clade: Sar
- Clade: Alveolata
- Division: Dinoflagellata
- Class: Dinophyceae
- Order: Dinophysiales
- Family: Dinophysaceae
- Genus: Ichthyodinium; Hollande & J.Cachon, 1952
- Species: I. chabelardi

Binomial name
- Ichthyodinium chabelardi Hollande & J.Cachon, 1952

Monotypic genus of single-celled organism

Ichthyodinium is a monotypic genus of dinoflagellates in the family Dinophysaceae. Ichthyodinium chabelardi (/ɪkθioʊˈdɪniəm/) is currently the sole described species of the genus.

Ichthyodinium chabelardi is a generalist parasite with a very broad geographic range. It has been found in locations such as the coasts of Indonesia and Vietnam, the Mediterranean Sea, and off the coast of Portugal. The full extent of its distribution is not known. While it can be found throughout most of the year, it has been observed to infect sardine eggs with the highest rates in the winter and early spring, from December to March.

It is of economic significance to the fish industry, where it depletes the numbers of many species of fin fish by acting as an endoparasite in host embryos. It was originally described in 1952 by Hollande and Cachon, who described it as an agent of infection amongst sardines off the coast of Algeria, in the Mediterranean Sea.

In 2006, Gestal et al. proposed a reclassification of I. chabelardi into the genus Perkinsoide based on its ultrastructure and RNA sequence, but several papers have opposed this reclassification based on its zoospore ultrastructure, as well as its small subunit rRNA and large subunit rRNA sequences. Recently, there has been evidence brought forth that there may be at least two distinct species of Ichthyodinium, since slight genetic differences have been detected between the European and Asian populations.

== Taxonomy ==
The genus Ichthyodinium was originally described in 1952 by Hollande and Cachon, who named the novel species they found Ichthyodinium chabelardi, and described it as an agent of infection amongst sardines off the coast of Algeria, in the Mediterranean Sea. They published a second paper with additional life cycle observations a year later, in 1953.

Phylogenetic analysis of I. chabelardi conducted in 2009 found evidence to support the inclusion of Ichthyodinium in Marine Alveolate Group I (MAGI). With this addition, MAGI will consist of the genera Ichthyodinium and Dubosquella, both of which are parasitic alveolates, thus maintaining MAGI as an exclusively parasitic group. When looking at the flagella of Ichthyodinium in cross section, they are spherical and thus lack the typical striated strand of a dinoflagellate transverse flagellum. The striated strand is also lacking on the flagella of zoospores of Duboscquella, suggesting this may be a synapomorphy of MAGI.

In 2006, Gestal et al. published a controversial paper calling for the reclassification of I. chabelardi. Gestal et al. asserted that I. chabelardi had been wrongly placed in the order Syndiniales, and should instead be placed in a new genus, Perkinsoide, and thus be renamed Perkinsoide chabelardi. They claimed that evidence for this reclassification could be found by looking at the life cycle, schizogonic divisions, structure of schizonts inside the host, nuclei without the typical dinoflagellate appearance, presence of rhoptry-like structures, and the presence of possible pseudo-conoid and biflaglleated spores.

Gestal et al. went on to conduct a phylogenetic analysis of the small and large subunit ribosomal RNA genes in the hope that this would provide additional evidence to support the reclassification. However, the results they found did not provide clear answers. Based on their phylogenetic analysis, they were merely able to determine that the parasite of interest should be positioned somewhere within the group consisting of dinoflagellates, perkinsids, and syndiniales. Several papers have since come out against this reclassification, arguing that I. chabelardi is the rightful name. One argument for this is that the life cycle of the parasite described by Gestal et al. does not match those of the genus Perkinsus, as it was described by Perkins in 1996. The parasite in question is reported to have a different pattern of cell division from members of Perkinsus and lacks a discharge tube of zoospores. It has been suggested that perhaps the early exogenous phase that Gestal et al. observed was indeed I. chabelardi, but that the observations made of the later stages, including the zoosporangia and zoospores, were of a different parasitic protist, one that was quite possibly not a dinoflagellate.

There is currently only one identified species in the genus Ichthyodinium, named Ichthyodinium chabelardi, which was first identified in the Mediterranean Sea, off the coast of Algeria by Hollande and Cachon in 1952. However, there is growing evidence that at least two distinct species may belong in the genus (Mori et al., 2007; Skovgaard et al., 2009;). In 2007, the mode of infection, development, and SSU rDNA sequence of an unknown parasite infecting leopard coral grouper (Plectropomus leopardus) off Japan were analyzed and compared to I. chabelardi (Mori et al., 2007). Although many similarities were drawn between the two, several differences were noted, causing the unknown parasite to be tentatively classified as Ichthyodinium sp. PL (PL being the initials of the scientific name for Leopard Coral Grouper) (Mori et al., 2007). Polymerase chain reaction (PCR) analysis using specific primers created from the SSU rDNA sequence of Icthyodinium sp. over several different years revealed the same species of parasite to be infecting the fish year after year (Mori et al., 2007).

In 2009, the sequences of the SSU rDNA, ITS1 (Internal transcribed spacer 1), ITS2, and 5.8S rDNA of I. chabelardi isolated from Bogue (Boops boops) and European pilchard (Sardina pilchardus) off the coast of Portugal were analyzed and found to be identical to each other (Skovgaard et al., 2009). This suggests that the parasites infecting both species of fish were from a single population (Skovgaard et al., 2009). However, when the SSU rDNA sequence from the Portuguese population was compared to sequences gathered from yellowfin tuna (Thunnas albacares) and leopard coral grouper (Plectropomus leopardus) in Asia, there was only a 97% similarity between them (Skovgaard et al., 2009). No morphological differences between the European and Asian populations have been identified yet (Skovgaard et al., 2009).

== Life cycle ==
I. chabelardi exists mainly in its parasitic form, during which time it lives within and obtains energy from a host fish egg. Later, it is released from its host and enters the free-living phase of its life cycle.

=== Primary schizonts ===
The earliest life stage is the primordial schizont, which occurs inside the host egg. It is a spherical uninucleate cell with a diameter of approximately 15 μm. The nuclei of the primordial schizont undergoes multiple mitotic divisions without cytoplasmic division to become a large, multi-nucleated cell of between 100 and 140 μm in diameter. The cytoplasm then forms cylindrical projections around each nucleus, which separate to form cylindrical, uninucleate cells of approximately 30 μm in diameter. These are the secondary schizonts.

=== Secondary schizonts ===
In the secondary schizont, lecithin begins to concentrate in the parasite cells. The shape of the cell rapidly passes from bat-shaped, to triangular, and then to a rosace form, featuring a repeating, somewhat circular pattern, seemingly as a result of successive longitudinal bipartitions. From the rosace form, secondary schizonts begin to form a long cord, extending 1–2 mm in length, in layers of successive groups of eight cells connected at their poles. At this point, the oil globule of the fish egg disappears and lipid particles can be observed inside the parasite cells.

=== Last generation schizonts ===
Elongated schizonts are released from the cord, and then enter the last generation schizont phase. The schizonts become spherical after a series of divisions and are now small and uni-nucleated, resembling the early primordial schizonts. By this stage, the energy reserves of the host embryo have been heavily depleted and the yolk sac is completely full of parasitic cells and is ready to burst. The yolk sac generally bursts immediately after the host larvae hatches, but may take as long as ten hours after hatching in some cases (Mori et al., 2007). The number of parasite cells released from a single yolk sac can be immense, with the number of cells released from a yolk sac of yellowfin tuna estimated to be around 40,000. Immediately following release from the host, parasite cells are spherical and non-motile (Skovgaard et al., 2009). Two hours after release from the host, the parasites, which are now at a diameter of 20-24 μm, begin to swim using their two flagella. As the parasites spend the next two to three days dividing, they change shape to become twisted and elongated and begin to move with more vigor (Skovgaard et al., 2009). After their third division, small and highly motile zoospores appear.

=== Zoospores ===
An in-depth study of I. chabelardi zoospores in 2016 found that it is this life stage that acts as the infectious agent. This study also provides an accurate description of zoospore ultrastructure, finding zoospores to be elongated and 8-9 μm x 4-5 μm in size. The apical end is wide and round, gradually becoming narrower as the cell extends towards the caudal end. The cell has a wide, shallow, spiral groove that forms one counter-clockwise turn around the cell when viewed from the apical end of the cell, thus making the cell asymmetric. The zoospores possess two smooth flagella, at least one of which appears to lay partly in the groove.

The cytoplasm of the zoospore houses well-developed mitochondria, as well as large inclusions that most likely function to store nutrient reserves. These inclusions may resemble either lipid globules or grains of storage carbohydrates, but both types have not been observed together in a single cell. Trichocysts appear as electron-dense structures of about 3 μm x 0.3 μm in size in transmission electron microscopy (TEM) images. In cross-section, they appear as squares and in diagonal section, they are rhombic in shape. The trichocysts are evenly distributed at the apical end, and are oriented along the longitudinal axis of the cell in the middle and at the caudal end of the cell. No structures were observed that could be used for penetration of the host egg cell (Simdyanov et al., 2016). The only observation made of something that was significantly different from a typical dinoflagellate zoospore was a large electron-transparent zone in the caudal part of the cell.

=== Variations ===
In several studies, observations have suggested that the secondary schizont stage is absent in some host species, and instead primary schizonts become last generation schizonts directly. (Gestal et al., 2006; Mori et al., 2007; In the case where the secondary schizont is absent, there is no rosace or cord formed. In other cases, released schizonts transformed directly into zoospores within ten minutes after release, and no zoosporangium formation was observed (Mori et al., 2007).

== Mode of parasitism ==
In 1994, Pedersen and Koie suggested that Ichtyodinium was spread to adult cod and turbot from their benthic prey, and was then spread to the next generation through their gametes. However, there is overwhelming evidence that refutes this, and instead suggests that the parasite is able to infect the fish host eggs laterally from the water.

Evidence suggests that Icthyodinium infects host fish eggs laterally from the water. (Mori et al., 2007; While the mode of penetration has not yet been observed, there are no detectable signs of penetration on the surface of infected egg. It has been theorized that the parasites are able to enter the host egg through the hole intended for sperm penetration following fertilization before the hole is able to close completely. In one study, primordial schizonts were detected in mackerel eggs even before the closure of the blastopore. After an outbreak in yellowfin tuna in Bali, Indonesia, an investigation found the rRNA sequence of Ichthyodinium sp. in the fertilized eggs, the larvae, and the rearing water, but not in the gonads of the parent fish or in the fish used as feed for the tuna. A further investigation showed that if the freshly spawned eggs were immediately transferred to containers of sterilized seawater, they would not become infected.

However, if the eggs were left in the rearing water for one hour or longer after spawning, they would become infected. Similarly, in Japan, outbreaks of Ichthyodinium sp. in leopard coral grouper have been found to be avoidable if the fertilized eggs are incubated in sterile, oxidant-treated seawater (Mori et al., 2007). The probability of detection of parasite infection in sardine eggs increases significantly with the age of the egg (Stratoudakis et al., 2000). Infected eggs have been observed with a maximum of three parasites. Most studies that have followed the progression of the host embryo after hatching have reported the death of all, or nearly all, hatched larvae following the rupturing of the yolk sac as the parasites are released into the water. Gestal et al., 2006; Shadrin et al., 2010)

== Identification ==
Infected host larvae will develop an opaque coloration of the yolk sac due to being full of parasites. The yolk sac of infected larvae becomes increasingly more filled with dark parasite cells as development progresses (Skovgaard et al., 2009). Most eggs will be infected within two hours after spawning. One to two hours post-spawning, the parasite genome may be detected in host eggs by PCR analysis. After eight hours post-spawning, the parasites will start to become detectable by light microscopy. At this stage, parasites are generally 13-15 μm in diameter. Two hours after being released from the host, parasites begin to swim with their two flagella. The transverse flagellum is about twice as long as the longitudinal flagellum, but both are around 300 nm in thickness (Skovgaard et al., 2009). At this stage, they are between 20 and 24 μm in diameter. Taking a cross section of the flagella reveals both flagellar cross-sections as being smooth and spherical, unlike typical dinokaryote dinoflagellate cells, which have flagellar dimorphism (Skovgaard et al., 2009). In typical dinokaryote dinoflagellate cells, the transverse flagellum is ribbon-like and the axoneme runs along the longer, outer edge of the flagella, and a contractile fiber runs along the shorter, inner edge, while the other flagellum is spherical and smooth in cross section (Skovgaard et al., 2009).

The cingulum is visible in both light microscopy and scanning electron microscopy (SEM) (Skovgaard et al., 2009). When looking at the dorsal side of the cell, the cingulum divides the cell into two equal parts, the hyposome and the episome (Skovgaard et al., 2009). However, when looking at the left lateral view of the cell, the hyposome appears twice as large as the episome (Skovgaard et al., 2009). The sulcus can be viewed as a shallow depression in SEM images of some cells (Skovgaard et al., 2009). It extends ventrally from the site of insertion of the longitudinal flagellum on the apical end of the cell to the posterior end of the cell (Skovgaard et al., 2009). The weak appearance of the cingulum and sulcus also make the morphology of Ichthyodinium sp. distinct from typical dinoflagellates, which tend to have a more pronounced cingulum and sulcus (Skovgaard et al., 2009).

In a 2009 study, no mastigonemes were found on the flagella of the asymmetric I. chabelardi zoospores (Skovgaard et al., 2009). This contradicts observations from 2006, in which mastigonemes were reported on the posterior flagellum of spherical zoospores (Gestal et al., 2006). It is possible that this discrepancy is the result of the two different cell types having flagella of different morphology, or the result of the flagella in the 2009 study being damaged during fixation (Skovgaard et al., 2009).

== Economic significance ==
Ichthyodinium sp. has been reported in a large number of fin fish species of Europe and Asia. Some of these, such as bluefin tuna, yellowfin tuna, mackerel, and cod, are of large economic significance (Pedersen and Koie, 1994; Skovgaard et al., 2009). The annual catch of the Japanese pilchard (Sardinops melanostictus) has been rapidly dropping since 1989, and Ichthyodinium sp. may be playing a role in this. In 2000, it was estimated that if sardine eggs infected with I. chabelardi experience 100% mortality, then this would roughly match the reported rates for the average daily mortality of sardine eggs and early larvae (Stratoudakis et al., 2000). This suggests that Ichthyodinium sp. may play a significant role in controlling populations of some fin fish species in the wild. Ichthyodinium sp. has also been documented as a problem in some fish farms (Mori et al., 2007). In 2005, a semi-enclosed system tank of yellowfin tuna in Bali, Indonesia experienced substantial losses due to larval deaths. The yolk sacs of the larvae were observed to be completely filled with parasites, which caused them to rupture and kill the newly hatched larvae. A phylogenetic analysis of the SSU rRNA sequence of the parasite revealed it to be Ichthyodinium sp.

A multi-year study conducted in Nha Trang Bay, Vietnam found a worrying trend of rapidly increasing prevalence of infected eggs and larvae (Shadrin et al., 2010). The prevalence of infection in 1993 was estimated to be no more than 1% of eggs and larvae collected (Shadrin et al., 2010). By the late 1990s, however, it was reported that a large proportion of the eggs and larvae collected in most samples were infected (Shadrin et al., 2010). In 2006, it was recorded that 98.6% of eggs and larvae were infected in nearby Cam Ranh Bay (Shadrin et al., 2010). Samples collected in nearby Van Phuong Bay and Phy Quoc Island in 2006 and 2008 also showed high rates of infection, between 29.3 and 59.4% (Shadrin et al., 2010). It has been hypothesized that as global climate change leads to rising ocean temperatures, the ranges of many generalist species, such as I. chabelardi, may expand. The rising ocean temperatures could also increase the rates of infection of host species. Together, these factors could lead to drastic increases in losses in the commercial fishing industry if fish tanks and surrounding seawater are not properly monitored, and appropriate steps taken to prevent infection of spawned eggs by Ichthyodinium sp.

== Ecology ==
While Ichthyodinium sp. was the suspected culprit of parasitized cod and turbot larvae found off the coast of Denmark, (Pedersen et al., 1994; it has been identified with certainty only in warm temperate and tropical waters (Skovgaard et al., 2009). In a study conducted in 2003, samples of Mackerel eggs were taken from fifty-nine locations stretching from Cape Finisterra, Spain (43oN) to the Outer Hebrides, UK (57oN). Eggs containing I. chabelardi were found from 43.4oN to 53.8oN, with a negative latitudinal trend in the proportion of eggs at each station that were parasitized. In the southernmost quartile of the samples, there was a mean infection rate of 54%, while in the northernmost quartile, the mean infection rate was only 9%. This suggests that I. chabelardi is most prevalent in warmer waters, closer to the equator.

Samples of fish eggs and larvae around Vietnam between 2004 and 2008 showed high rates of infection (29.3 - 98.6%) in the southern samples, but no infected eggs at all were found in the northern samples (Shadrin et al., 2010). A year-long survey of sardines from the Adriatic Sea in 1990 found I. chabelardi present in every month that had sardine egg spawning (Dulcic, 1998). The infection rates varied considerably from month to month, with the colder months having higher infection rates and the warmer months having lower infection rates (Dulcic, 1998). December (50%) and January (48.2%) had the highest rates of infection, while May (6.8%) and September (2.6%) had the lowest rates of infection (Dulcic, 1998). No sardine eggs were spawned in June, July, or August, so no infection rates could be taken (Dulcic, 1998).

== Reported host species ==
- Bluefin Tuna (Thunnus thynnus): Identified in bluefin tuna in Japan in 2004.
- Bogue (Boops boops): Identified in bogue eggs off the coast of Portugal (Skovgaard et al., 2009).
- Bristlemouth (Mourolicus pennant): (Hollande and Cachon, 1952;
- Cod (Gadus morhua) *Suspected: Cod eggs collected off the coast of Denmark were found to be infected with a protistan parasite that was hypothesized to be I. chabelardi with rates ranging between 14 and 88% (Pedersen and Koie, 1994). Parasites were found in at least some eggs of all eight batches collected (Pedersen and Koie, 1994).
- European pilchard (Sardina pilchardus): I. chabelardi was first identified in sardines from the Mediterranean by Hollande and Cachon in 1952.(Hollande & Cachon, 1952; In 1997 and 1999, sardine eggs were sampled off the coast of Portugal, and approximately 30% of them were found to be infected with I. chabelardi (Stratoudakis et al., 2000).
- Gilthead seabream (Sparus aurata): (Marinaro, 1971;
- Leopard Coral Grouper (Plectropomus leopardus): Mass mortality events of Leopard Coral Grouper around Okinawa, Japan caused by an unknown parasite have been reported repeatedly since 1990 (Mori et al., 2007). Based on an analysis of the parasite's mode of infection, development, and SSU rDNA sequence, the unknown parasite was identified as Ichthyodinium sp. (Mori et al., 2007).
- Mackerel (Scomber scombrus): In 1998, fifty-nine samples of Mackerel eggs, totaling 2,409 eggs, were collected in the north-east Atlantic and checked for parasitism by I. chabelardi. Of these, 1,099 eggs (46%) were found to be infected. Thirty-nine (66%) of the collection stations had at least one parasitized egg.
- Turbot (Scopththalmus maximus) *Suspected: Turbot eggs collected off the coast of Denmark were found to be infected with a protistan parasite that was hypothesized to be I. chabelardi (Pedersen and Koie, 1994;
- Yellowfin tuna (Thunnas albacares): In 2005, larval deaths of yellowfin tuna in a semi-enclosed system tank in Bali, Indonesia were attributed to Ichthyodinium sp.

== Geographical distribution ==
The complete global distribution of Ichthyodinium sp. is currently unknown (Gleasen et al., 2019). Among general surveys conducted to sample dinoflagellate species, no data for Ichthyodinium sp. has been collected at most sites (Gleasen et al., 2019). More surveys of Ichthyodinium sp., taken at broader ranges, are needed to gain a better grasp of its true distribution (Gleasen et al., 2019).

Ichthyodinium sp. has so far been recorded in the waters of Algeria (Holland and Cachon, 1952), Croatia (Dulcic, 1998), Denmark (Pedersen and Koie, 1994), Indonesia, Japan(Mori et al., 2007), Portugal (Stratoudakis et al., 2000; Skovgaard et al., 2009), Spain, the United Kingdom, and Vietnam (Shadrin et al., 2010).
