= Fragilidium =

Scientific classification
- Domain: Eukaryota
- Clade: Sar
- Clade: Alveolata
- Phylum: Dinoflagellata
- Class: Dinophyceae
- Order: Gonyaulacales
- Family: Pyrophacaceae
- Genus: Fragilidium; Balech ex Loeblich III

Genus of algae

Fragilidium is a genus of dinoflagellates belonging to the family Pyrophacaceae.

Species:

- Fragilidium duplocampanaeforme Nézan & Chomérat
- Fragilidium fissile Balech
- Fragilidium heterolobum Balech ex Loeblich III
- Fragilidium subglobosum (Stosch) Loeblich III
