= Okadaic acid =

Names
- Preferred IUPAC name (2R)-2-Hydroxy-2-{[(2S,5R,6R,8S)-5-hydroxy-8-{(2R,3E)-4-[(2R,4′aR,6′S,8′R,8′aS)-8′-hydroxy-6′-{(1S,3S)-1-hydroxy-3-[(2S,3R,6S)-3-methyl-1,7-dioxaspiro[5.5]undecan-2-yl]butyl}-7′-methylidenehexahydro-3′H-spiro[oxolane-2,2′-pyrano[3,2-b]pyran]-5-yl]but-3-en-2-yl}-10-methyl-1,7-dioxaspiro[5.5]undec-10-en-2-yl]methyl}propanoic acid
- Other names 9,10-Deepithio-9,10-didehydroacanthifolicin

Identifiers
CAS Number	78111-17-8
3D model (JSmol)	Interactive image
ChEBI	CHEBI:CHEBI:7733
ChEMBL	ChEMBL280487
ChemSpider	393845
DrugBank	DB02169
ECHA InfoCard	100.116.145
EC Number	616-589-8
IUPHAR/BPS	5349
KEGG	C01945
MeSH	Acid Okadaic Acid
PubChem CID	446512
UNII	1W21G5Q4N2
CompTox Dashboard (EPA)	DTXSID60880002
- InChI: InChI=1S/C44H68O13/c1-25-21-34(55-44(23-25)35(46)12-11-31(54-44)24-41(6,50)40(48)49)26(2)9-10-30-14-18-43(53-30)19-15-33-39(57-43)36(47)29(5)38(52-33)32(45)22-28(4)37-27(3)13-17-42(56-37)16-7-8-20-51-42/h9-10,23,26-28,30-39,45-47,50H,5,7-8,11-22,24H2,1-4,6H3,(H,48,49)/b10-9+/t26-,27-,28+,30+,31+,32+,33-,34+,35-,36-,37+,38+,39-,41-,42+,43-,44-/m1/s1 Key: QNDVLZJODHBUFM-WFXQOWMNSA-N; InChI=1/C44H68O13/c1-25-21-34(55-44(23-25)35(46)12-11-31(54-44)24-41(6,50)40(48)49)26(2)9-10-30-14-18-43(53-30)19-15-33-39(57-43)36(47)29(5)38(52-33)32(45)22-28(4)37-27(3)13-17-42(56-37)16-7-8-20-51-42/h9-10,23,26-28,30-39,45-47,50H,5,7-8,11-22,24H2,1-4,6H3,(H,48,49)/b10-9+/t26-,27-,28+,30+,31+,32+,33-,34+,35-,36-,37+,38+,39-,41-,42+,43-,44-/m1/s1 Key: QNDVLZJODHBUFM-WFXQOWMNBB; InChI=1S/C44H68O13/c1-25-21-34(55-44(23-25)35(46)12-11-31(54-44)24-41(6,50)40(48)49)26(2)9-10-30-14-18-43(53-30)19-15-33-39(57-43)36(47)29(5)38(52-33)32(45)22-28(4)37-27(3)13-17-42(56-37)16-7-8-20-51-42/h9-10,23,26-28,30-39,45-47,50H,5,7-8,11-22,24H2,1-4,6H3,(H,48,49)/b10-9+/t26-,27-,28+,30+,31+,32+,33-,34+,35-,36-,37+,38+,39-,41-,42+,43-,44-/m1/s1 Key: QNDVLZJODHBUFM-WFXQOWMNSA-N
- SMILES: O=C(O)[C@@](O)(C)C[C@H]7O[C@]/1(O[C@@H](CC(=C\1)\C)[C@@H](/C=C/[C@@H]6O[C@@]3(O[C@H]2[C@H](O)/C(=C)[C@H](O[C@@H]2CC3)[C@@H](O)C[C@H](C)[C@H]5O[C@]4(OCCCC4)CC[C@H]5C)CC6)C)[C@H](O)CC7

Properties
Chemical formula	C_{44}H_{68}O_{13}
Molar mass	805.015 g·mol^{−1}
Melting point	164-166 °C

Hazards
- GHS labelling
Pictograms	(GHS06: Toxic) (GHS07: Exclamation mark)
Signal word	Danger
Hazard statements	H301, H311, H315, H331
Precautionary statements	P261, P262, P264, P270, P271, P280, P301+P316, P302+P352, P304+P340, P316, P321, P330, P332+P317, P361+P364, P362+P364, P403+P233, P405, P501
- Except where otherwise noted, data are given for materials in their standard state (at 25 °C [77 °F], 100 kPa). verify (what is ?) Infobox references

Okadaic acid, C_{44}H_{68}O_{13}, is a toxin produced by several species of dinoflagellates. It is known to accumulate in both marine sponges and shellfish. One of the primary causes of diarrhetic shellfish poisoning, okadaic acid is a potent inhibitor of specific protein phosphatases, and has a variety of negative effects on cells. A polyketide, polyether derivative of a C_{38} fatty acid, okadaic acid and other members of its family have illuminated many biological processes both with respect to dinoflagellate polyketide synthesis as well as the role of protein phosphatases in cell growth.

== History ==
As early as 1961, reports of gastrointestinal disorders following the consumption of cooked mussels appeared in both the Netherlands and Los Lagos. Attempts were made to determine the source of the symptoms; however, they failed to elucidate the true culprit, instead implicating a species of microplanctonic dinoflagellates. In the summers of the late 1970s, a series of food poisoning outbreaks in Japan led to the discovery of a new type of shellfish poisoning. Named for the most prominent symptoms, the new Diarrhetic Shellfish Poisoning (DSP) only affected the northern portion of Honshu during 1976; however, by 1977 large cities such as Tokyo and Yokohama were affected. Research into the shellfish consumed in the affected regions showed that a fat-soluble toxin was responsible for the 164 documented cases, and this toxin was traced to mussels and scallops harvested in the Miyagi prefecture. In northeastern Japan, a legend had existed that during the season of paulownia flowers, shellfish can be poisonous. Studies following this outbreak showed that toxicity of these mussels and scallops appeared and increased during the months of June and July, and all but disappeared between August and October.

Elsewhere in Japan, in 1975 Fujisawa pharmaceutical company observed that the extract of a black sponge, Halichondria okadai, was a potent cytotoxin; this was dubbed Halichondrine-A. In 1981, the structure of one such toxin, okadaic acid, was determined after it was extracted from both the black sponge in Japan, Halichondria okadai, for which it was named, and a sponge in the Florida Keys, Halichondria melanodocia. Okadaic acid sparked research both for its cytotoxicicity, and for being the first reported marine ionophore.

Several years later, one of the toxins responsible for DSP, dinophysistoxin-1 (DTX-1) (named for one of the organisms implicated in its production, Dinophysis fortii) was compared to and shown to be very chemically similar to okadaic acid; okadaic acid itself was implicated in DSP around the same time. Since its initial discovery, reports of DSP have spread throughout the world, and are especially concentrated in Japan, South America and Europe.

== Synthesis ==
=== Derivatives ===
Okadaic acid (OA) and its derivatives, the dinophysistoxins (DTX), are members of a group of molecules called polyketides. The complex structure of these molecules include multiple spiroketals, along with fused ether rings.

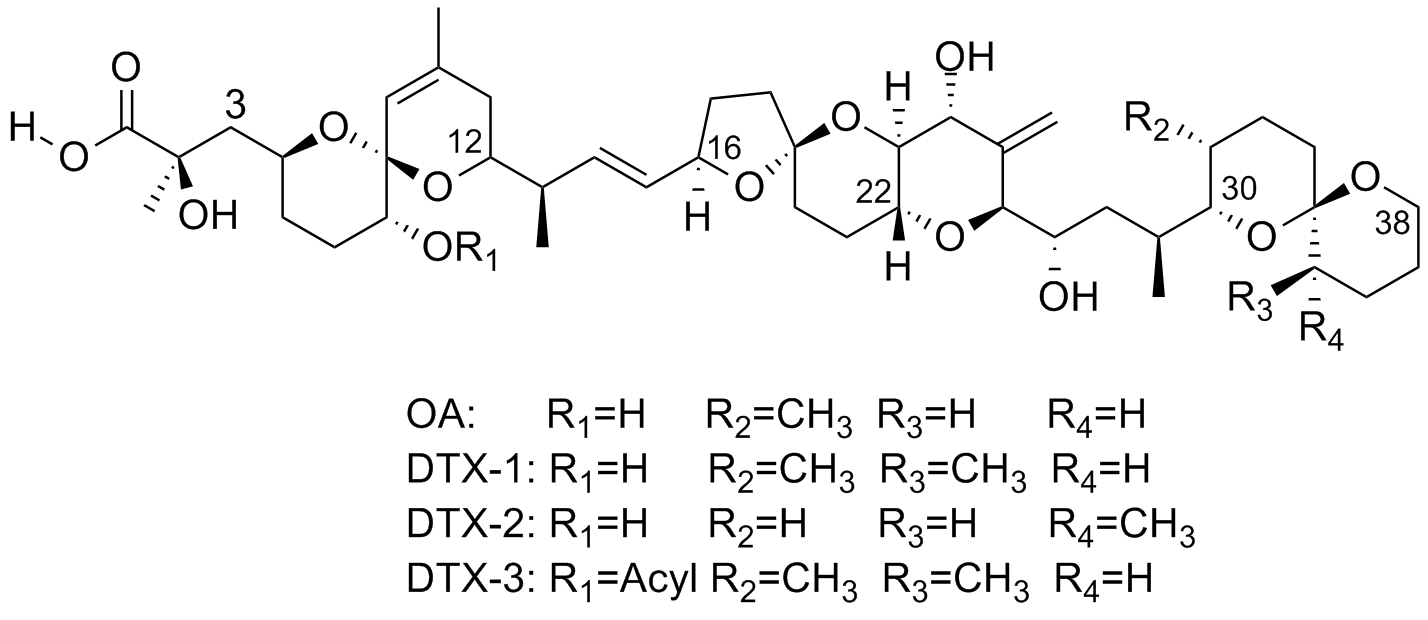
Structures of Okadaic Acid and the Dinophysistoxins

=== Biosynthesis ===
Being polyketides, the okadaic acid family of molecules are synthesized by dinoflagellates via polyketide synthase (PKS). However, unlike the majority of polyketides, the dinoflagellate group of polyketides undergo a variety of unusual modifications. Okadaic acid and its derivatives are some of the most well studied of these polyketides, and research on these molecules via isotopic labeling has helped to elucidate some of those modifications.

Okadaic acid is formed from a starter unit of glycolate, found at carbons 37 and 38, and all subsequent carbons in the chain are derived from acetate. Because polyketide synthesis is similar to fatty acid synthesis, during chain extension the molecule may undergo reduction of the ketone, dehydration, and reduction of the olefin. Failure to perform one of more of these three steps, combined with several unusual reactions is what allows for the formation of the functionality of okadaic acid. Carbon deletion and addition at the alpha and beta position comprise the other transformations present in the okadaic acid biosynthesis.

Carbon deletion occurs by way of a Favorskii rearrangement and subsequent decarboxylation. Attack of a ketone in the growing chain by enzyme-bound acetates, and subsequent decarboxylation/dehydration results in an olefin replacing the ketone, in both alpha and beta alkylation. After this the olefin can isomerize to more thermodynamically stable positions, or can be activated for cyclizations, in order to produce the natural product.

=== Laboratory syntheses ===
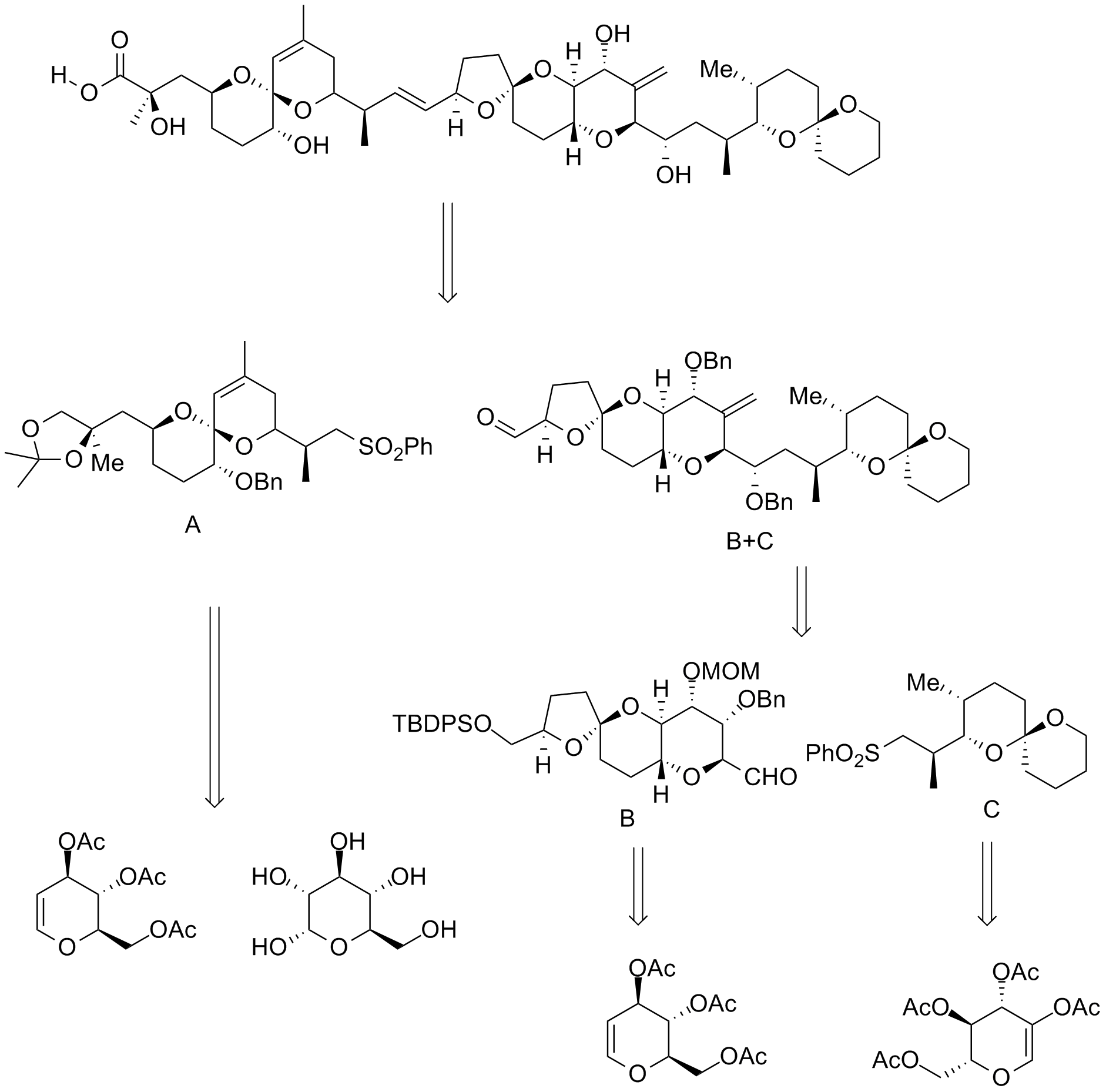
Isobe's Synthesis of Okadaic Acid.

Three total syntheses of okadaic acid have been achieved, along with many more formal syntheses and several total syntheses of the other dinophysistoxins. The first total synthesis of okadaic acid was completed in 1986 by Isobe et al., just five years after the molecule's structure was elucidated. The next two were completed in 1997 and 1998 by the Forsyth and Ley groups respectively.

In Isobe's synthesis, the molecule was broken into three pieces, along the C14–C15 bonds, and the C27–C28 bonds. This formed fragments A, B, and C, which were all synthesized separately, after which the B and C fragments were combined, and then combined with the A fragment. This synthesis contained 106 steps, with a longest linear sequence of 54 steps. The precursors to all three fragments were all glucose derivatives obtained from the chiral pool. Spiroketals were obtained from precursor ketone diols, and were therefore formed thermally in acid.

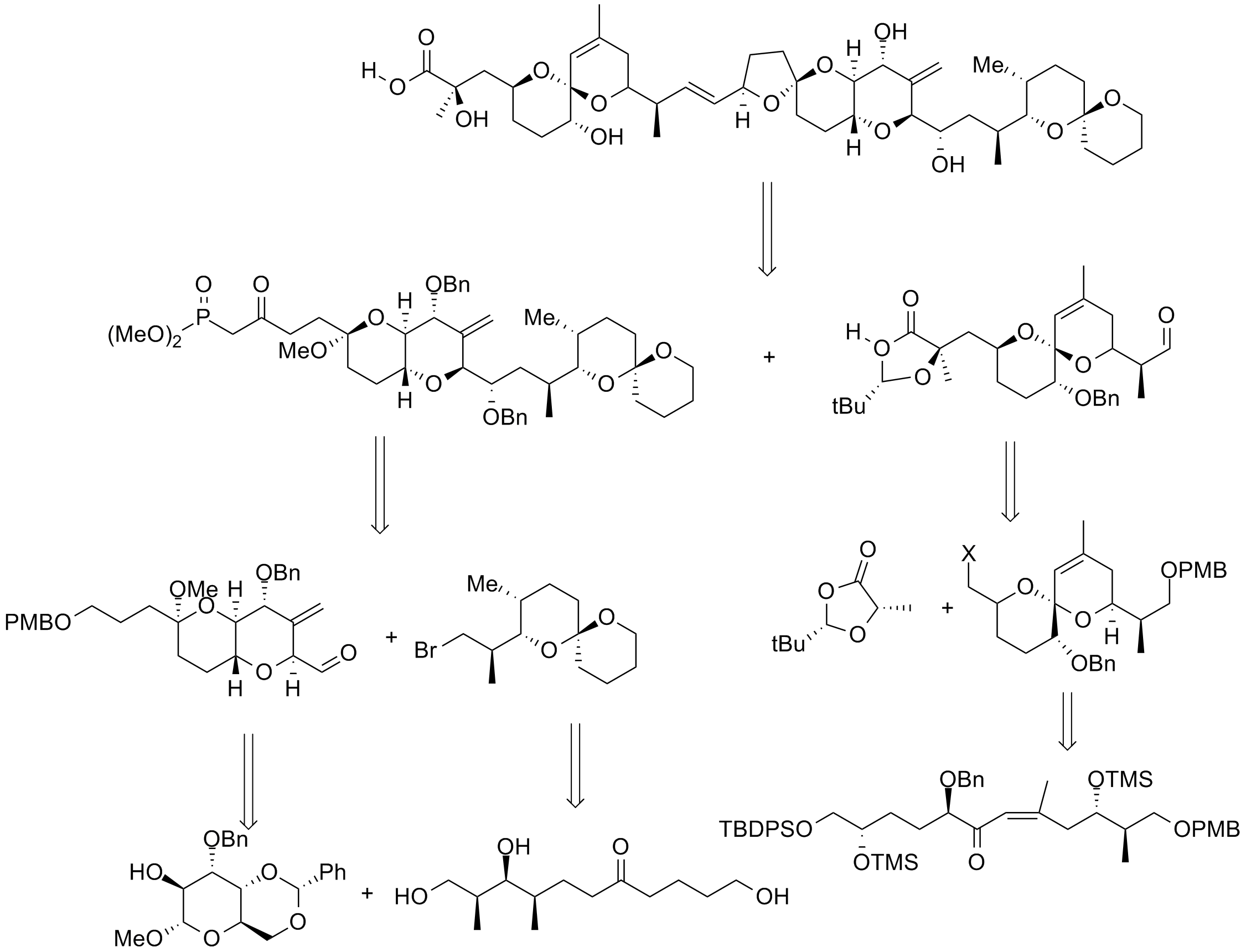
Forsyth's Synthesis of Okadaic Acid.

Similar to Isobe's synthesis, the Forsyth synthesis sought to reduce the number of steps and to increase potential for designing analogues late in the synthesis. To do this, Forsyth et al. designed the synthesis to allow for structural changes and installation of important functional groups before large pieces were joined. Their resulting synthesis was 3% yielding, with 26 steps in the longest linear sequence. As above, spiroketalization was performed thermodynamically with introduction of acid.

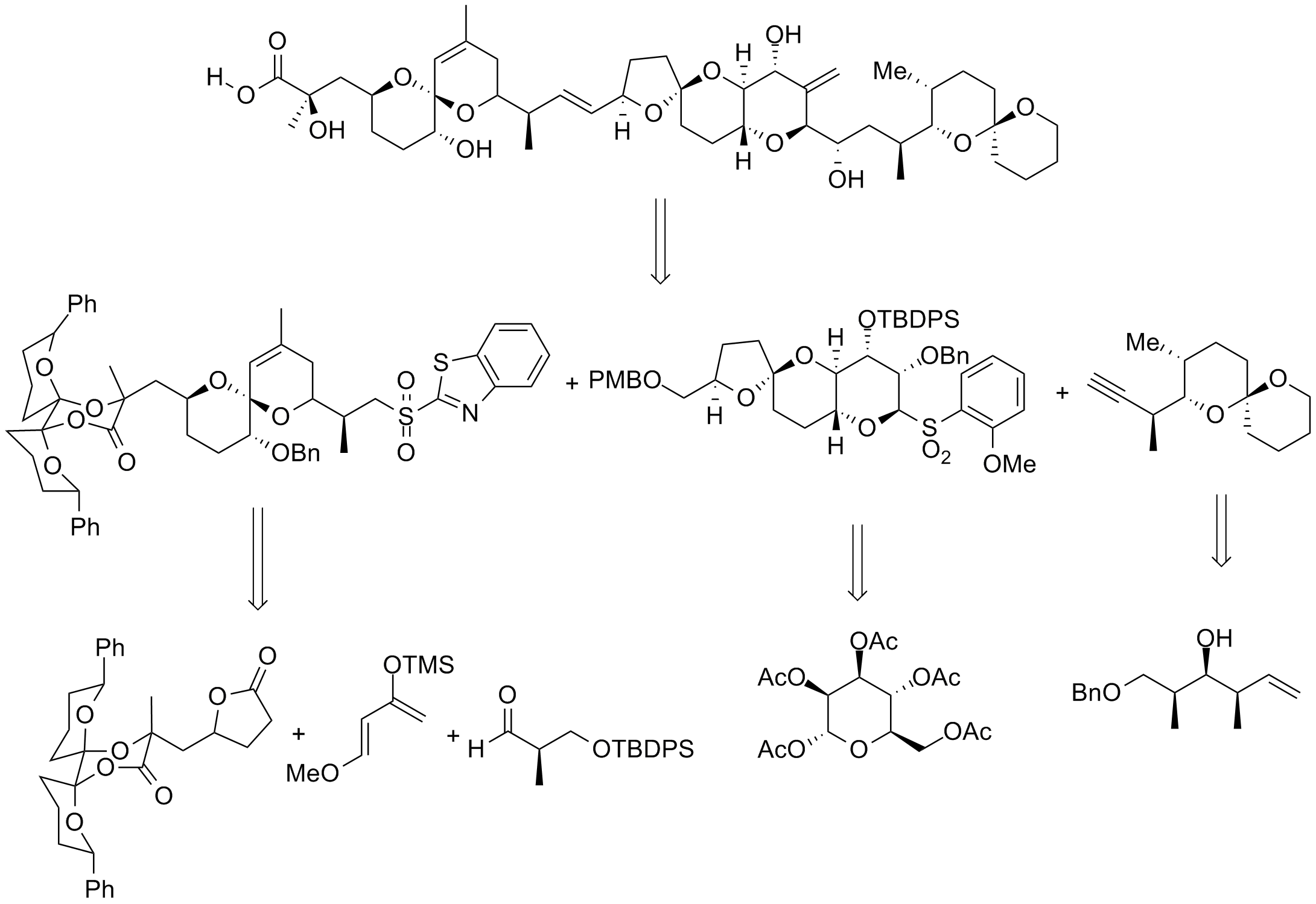
Ley's Synthesis of Okadaic Acid.

Ley's synthesis of okadaic acid is most unlike its predecessors, although it still contains similar motifs. Like the others, this synthesis divided okadaic acid into three components along the acyclic segments. However, designed to display new techniques developed in their group, Ley's synthesis included forming the spiroketals using (diphenylphosphineoxide)-tetrahydrofuran and (phenylsulfonyl)-tetrahydropyrans, allowing for more mild conditions. Similar to those above, a portion of the stereochemistry in the molecule was set by starting materials obtained from the chiral pool, in this case mannose.

== Biology ==
=== Mechanism of action ===
Okadaic acid (OA) and its relatives strongly inhibit protein phosphatases, specifically serine/threonine phosphatases. Furthermore, of the four such phosphatases, okadaic acid and its relatives specifically target protein phosphatase 1 (PP1) and protein phosphatase 2A (PP2A), at the exclusion of the other two, with dissociation constants for the two proteins of 150 nM and 30 pM respectively. Because of this, this class of molecules has been used to study the action of these phosphatases in cells. Once OA binds to the phosphatase protein(s), it results in hyperphosphorylation of specific proteins within the afflicted cell, which in turn reduces control over sodium secretion and solute permeability of the cell. Affinity between okadaic acid and its derivatives and PP2A has been tested, and it was shown that the only derivative with a lower dissociation constant, and therefore higher affinity, was DTX1, which has been shown to be 1.6 times stronger. Furthermore, for the purpose of determining the toxicity of mixtures of different okadaic acid derivatives, inhibitory equivalency factors for the relatives of okadaic acid have been studied. In wild type PP2A, the inhibitory equivalency relative to okadaic acid were 0.9 for DTX-1 and 0.6 for DTX-2.

=== Toxicology ===
The main route of exposure to DSP from okadaic acid and its relatives is through the consumption of shellfish. It was initially shown that the toxic agents responsible for DSP tend to be most concentrated in the hepatopancreas, followed by the gills for certain shellfish. The symptoms for diarrhetic shellfish poisoning include intense diarrhea and severe abdominal pains, and rarely nausea and vomiting, and they tend to occur anytime between 30 minutes and at most 12 hours after consuming toxic shellfish. It has been estimated that it takes roughly 40 μg of okadaic acid to trigger diarrhea in adult humans.

=== Medical uses ===
Because of its inhibitory effects in phosphatases, okadaic acid has shown promise in the world of medicine for numerous potential uses. During its initial discovery, okadaic acid, specifically the crude source extract, showed potent inhibition of cancer cells. However, it was shown that the more cytotoxic component of H. okadai was a separate family of compounds, the Halichondrines, and as such research into the cytotoxicity of okadaic acid decreased. However, the unique function of okadaic acid upon cells maintained biological interest in the molecule. Okadaic acid has been shown to have neurotoxic, immunotoxic, and embryotoxic effects. Furthermore, in two-stage carcinogenesis of mouse skin, the molecule and its relatives have been shown to have tumor promoting effects. Because of this, the effects of okadaic acid on Alzheimer's, AIDS, diabetes, and other human diseases have been studied.

== See also ==
- Canadian Reference Materials
- Brevetoxin
- Ciguatoxin
- Domoic acid
- Saxitoxin
- Tetrodotoxin
- Rubratoxin
