= Histioneis =

Scientific classification
- Domain: Eukaryota
- Clade: Diaphoretickes
- Clade: SAR
- Clade: Alveolata
- Phylum: Myzozoa
- Superclass: Dinoflagellata
- Class: Dinophyceae
- Order: Dinophysiales
- Family: Dinophysaceae
- Genus: Histioneis; Stein

Genus of single-celled organisms

Histioneis is a genus of dinoflagellates. According to the World Register of Marine Species, it contains 86 species.
