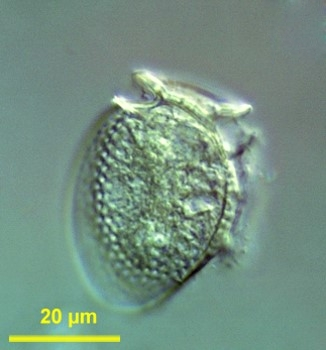

Scientific classification
- Domain: Eukaryota
- Clade: Diaphoretickes
- Clade: Sar
- Clade: Alveolata
- Phylum: Myzozoa
- Superclass: Dinoflagellata
- Class: Dinophyceae
- Order: Dinophysiales
- Family: Dinophysaceae
- Genus: Dinophysis; Ehrenberg

= Dinophysis =

Genus of single-celled organisms

Dinophysis is a genus of dinoflagellates common in tropical, temperate, coastal and oceanic waters. It was first described in 1839 by Christian Gottfried Ehrenberg.

Dinophysis are typically medium-sized cells (30-120 μm). The structural plan and plate tabulation are conserved within the genus. Dinophysis thecae are divided into halves by a sagittal fission suture. There are five types of thecae ornamentation in this genus, and those are a useful character for species identification. Dinophysis mainly divide by binary fission.

Dinophysis chloroplasts are usually rod-shaped or granular and yellow or brown colored. Some Dinophysis spp. take up kleptoplastids when feeding. Toxic Dinophysis produce okadaic acid, dinophysistoxins, and pectenotoxins, which inhibit protein phosphatase and cause diarrhea.

== Background ==
The etymology of this genus name comes from Greek, Dino comes from "deinos" (δεινός) meaning terrible and "physis" (φύσις) meaning nature.

The genus was first described in 1839 by Ehrenberg, which is why the holotype species of this genus is Dinophysis acuta Ehrenberg. It has been found that what were considered different Dinophysis species might just be different life stages.

Severe diarrheic shellfish poisoning breakouts in northeast Japan led to the identification of a Dinophysis species that produces toxins, Dinophysis fortii in 1976–77. This genus is difficult to maintain in culture leading to challenges in gaining knowledge of these organisms. Some Dinophysis spp. have kleptoplastids of cryptomonad origin, specifically from the cryptomonad Teleaulax amphioxeia. Dinophysis caudata have acquired these kleptoplastids by engulfing the ciliate Mesodinium rubrum which has engulfed T. amphioxeia plastids. Cryptomonad plastids have four membranes and a nucleomorph and are a product of secondary endosymbiosis.

For years it was believed that Dinophysis did not have a sexual cycle. However, it is now apparent that gamete cells can form in Dinophysis acuminata and D. acuta; this was found when small, spherical cells seemed to form inside larger ones.

== Habitat and ecology ==
The common habitat of Dinophysis is in tropical, temperate, coastal and oceanic waters. Although most Dinophysis are marine and planktonic, some have been found in coastal lagoons

Dinophysis caudata feed on ciliates, specifically Mesodinium rubrum through myzocytosis. Picophytoplankton, bacteria, and cryptomonads are also likely part of the diet of Dinophysis. For culture, Dinophysis are maintained on mixotrophic nutrition. Although they are mixotrophic, they are mainly phagotrophic and photosynthesis is linked to kleptoplastids.

== Description of the organism ==
=== Morphology ===
The typical cell size of Dinophysis ranges from 30 to 120 μm, they are medium-sized cells. It is possible for the cell size of Dinophysis to vary from large, vegetative cells to small, gamete-like cells. Dinophysis have hypothecae that consist of two large plates, which take up most of the space of the theca, as well as some small platelets. The genus is characterized by having 18 plates: four epithecal plates, two small apical plates, four sulcal plates, four cingular plates, and four hypothecal plates. They have a cingulum, which is anteriorly positioned, and the cells are laterally compressed. The structural plan and plate tabulation are conserved within the genus. Dinophysis thecae are divided in halves by a sagittal fission suture. Thecal ornamentation is a useful character for species identification. There are five types of thecae ornamentation in this genus. Type A is a smooth theca or a theca with shallow depressions, a single row of pores lines the anterior and posterior cingular lists and the margins of the large epithecal and hypothecal plates. Type B has a more pitted thecal surface but has fewer pores; Type C is characterized by shallow hexagonal reticulation in the theca and a pore in the middle of each areola. Type D exhibits large, spherical areolation in the thecal surface with pores in the center of every 3-5 areolae; type E is characteristic of laterally flattened Dinophysis and consists of a circular areolation thecal surface and a central pore in nearly all areolae.

=== Plastids and kleptoplastids ===
Minute, usually rod-shaped or granular and yellow or brown colored chloroplasts are characteristic of Dinophysis. The chloroplasts have stacks of three thylakoids and an internal pyrenoid. In senescent cells, chloroplasts tend to aggregate in the middle and form orange patches.

Some Dinophysis spp. likely possess plastids from cryptomonad origin, since the plastids are identical to those of the cryptophyte Teleaulax amphioxeia. In this case, the process consisted in the engulfment (incomplete phagocytosis) of the ciliate M. rubrum which in turn engulfed a whole cryptomonad and now only the plastids remain.

There has been debate surrounding whether the plastids of D. caudata are permanent or kleptoplastids. It is now known that the plastids of D. caudata are kleptoplastids and the explanation for the discrepancy among molecular and ultrastructural data is due to structural modification during the acquisition of plastids through feeding. When D. caudata was fed M. rubrum reddish-brown plastids, these were not digested in a food vacuole, rather they were transported to the periphery of the cell to join the rest of the plastids. The plastids that were ingested are surrounded by membrane vesicles and transferred to the cytoplasm. During plastid sequestration, the plastids see a change in morphology, the thylakoids of M. rubrum plastids become irregular and distended. The change in pigment of the plastids is due to photoactivity, the change of low light to high light causes the plastids to turn green when there is no prey. The cryptophyte nucleomorph found in M. rubrum is lost in D. caudata. The final plastids of D. caudata appeared stellate and had clustered pyrenoids terminally positioned, their thylakoid membranes are placed in pairs.

== Life cycle ==
Dinophysis mainly divides asexually by binary fission. For years it was believed that Dinophysis did not have a sexual cycle. However, it is now apparent that gamete cells can form in D. acuminata and D. acuta; this was found when small, spherical cells seemed to form inside larger ones. While the role of a sexual cycle in Dinophysis is not fully understood yet, there is a proposed model for how this works. In the proposed model, vegetative cells give rise to small motile cells (the smaller cells previously observed within the larger cells). The smaller cells then also become vegetative and act like gametes and after conjugation the cells divide and encyst. The smaller cells that give rise to gametes tend to have thinner thecae and less developed cingular and sulcal lists. They also are flagellated and swim, they use their flagella and lists to wrap around another gamete cell for conjugation.

Although the gametes are part of a dimorphic sexual cycle, sex cysts do not play an active role in the seeding of Dinophysis populations.

== Pseudogenes ==
While toxic species of Dinophysis such as D. acuminata have a single gene for LSU rRNA, non-toxic species seem to have two distinct classes of LSU rRNA. The difference between these two classes was a 70 bp deletion, indicating the shorter product might be a pseudogene. The pseudogene can be used as a marker of D. acuminata and might conveniently serve as a marker of toxic and non-toxic strains and bring more insight to the genetics of toxicity of Dinophysis.

== Phylogenetics ==
Dinoflagellates are algae and according to recent phylogeny they are sister groups to ciliates and apicomplexans. Most phylogenetic studies are done with sequences of both large and small ribosomal subunits and do not always agree with morphological studies based on thecal plates. Sequencing of the small subunit of the ribosome of Dinophysis revealed very similar sequences in three species of Dinophysis (D. acuminata, D. norvegica and D. acuta), suggesting that photosynthetic Dinophysis have evolved recently.

== Practical importance ==
Dinophysis are a threat to shellfish aquaculture due to toxic lipophilic shellfish toxins that they produce. Dinophysis have cryptophyte-like pigments and at least seven species of Dinophysis contain diarrheic shellfish toxins.

Toxic Dinophysis produce okadaic acid, dinophysistoxins, and pectenotoxins, which inhibit protein phosphatase and produce diarrhea. The more dominant the okadates are, the higher the impact on public health. Toxins are secondary metabolites, and, in some cases, a single species can produce multiple types of toxins. The production of these is controlled by both genetic factors and the environment. The enzymes produced vary due to the environment in which Dinophysis grow. The boreal seas, temperate seas and tropical seas are where most assemblages of Dinophysis that cause diarrheic shellfish poisoning occur. Common features associated with toxic Dinophysis include: large sizes, highly developed cingular and sulcal lists and hypothecal processes.

== Species ==
- Dinophysis acuminata Claparède & Lachmann
- Dinophysis acuta Ehrenberg
- Dinophysis acutissima Gaarder
- Dinophysis alata E.G.Jørgensen
- Dinophysis amandula (Balech) Sournia
- Dinophysis amphora Balech
- Dinophysis amygdala O.W.Paulsen
- Dinophysis anabilis Abé
- Dinophysis antarctica Balech
- Dinophysis apicata (Kofoid & Skogsberg) Abé
- Dinophysis apiculata Meunier
- Dinophysis arctica Mereschkowsky
- Dinophysis argus (Stein) Abé
- Dinophysis balechii D.R.Norris & L.D.Berner
- Dinophysis baltica (Paulsen) Kofoid & Skogsberg
- Dinophysis bibulba Balech
- Dinophysis biceps Schiller
- Dinophysis braarudii (O.Nordli) Balech
- Dinophysis capitulata Balech
- Dinophysis carpentariae Wood
- Dinophysis caudata Saville-Kent
- Dinophysis collaris Kofoid & Michener
- Dinophysis conjuncta D.Parra-Toriz, K.Esqueda-Lara & D.U.Hernández-Becerril
- Dinophysis contracta (Kofoid & Skogsberg) Balech
- Dinophysis cornuta (N.Peters) Balech
- Dinophysis crassior Paulsen
- Dinophysis curvata Schiller
- Dinophysis cyrtoptera Balech
- Dinophysis dens Pavillard
- Dinophysis dentata Schiller
- Dinophysis dubia Balech
- Dinophysis equalantii Balech
- Dinophysis exigua Kofoid & Skogsberg
- Dinophysis expulsa Kofoid & Michener
- Dinophysis fortii Pavillard
- Dinophysis fortunata Sournia
- Dinophysis gaarderae Sournia
- Dinophysis granii Paulsen
- Dinophysis hasleae Balech
- Dinophysis hastata Stein
- Dinophysis hyalina Wood
- Dinophysis indica V.Srinivasan
- Dinophysis infundibulum J. Schiller
- Dinophysis intermedia Cleve
- Dinophysis irregularis (Lebour) Balech
- Dinophysis islandica Paulsen
- Dinophysis joergersenii Kofoid & Skogsberg
- Dinophysis lacrima (Gaarder) Balech
- Dinophysis laevis Claparède & Lachmann
- Dinophysis laticincta Balech
- Dinophysis longialata Gran & Braarud
- Dinophysis meteorii Böhm
- Dinophysis meunieri Schiller
- Dinophysis micheneri Sournia
- Dinophysis micropleura Balech
- Dinophysis micropterygia P.Dangeard
- Dinophysis microstrigiliformis Abé
- Dinophysis miles Cleve
- Dinophysis mitroides Sournia
- Dinophysis monacantha Kofoid & Skogsberg
- Dinophysis moresbyensis Wood
- Dinophysis mucronata (Kofoid & Skogsberg) Sournia
- Dinophysis nasuta (Stein) Parke & Dixon
- Dinophysis neolenticula Sournia
- Dinophysis nias Karsten
- Dinophysis norvegica Claparède & Lachmann
- Dinophysis odiosa (Pavillard) Tai & Skogsberg
- Dinophysis okamurae Kofoid & Skogsberg
- Dinophysis opposita Wood
- Dinophysis ovata Claparéde & Lachmann
- Dinophysis oviformis Chen & Ni
- Dinophysis ovum (F.Schütt) T.H.Abé
- Dinophysis pacifica Wood
- Dinophysis paralata Sournia
- Dinophysis parva Schiller
- Dinophysis parvula (Schütt) Balech
- Dinophysis paulseni (Schiller) Balech
- Dinophysis pedunculata
- Dinophysis pellucidum Levring
- Dinophysis perforata Sournia
- Dinophysis phalacromoides (E.H.Jörgensen) F.Gomez, P.Lopez-Garcia & D.Moreira
- Dinophysis pugiuncula (Jørgensen) Balech
- Dinophysis pulchella (Lebour) Balech
- Dinophysis punctata Jörgensen
- Dinophysis pusilla Jørgensen
- Dinophysis recurva Kofoid & Skogsberg
- Dinophysis rete Sournia
- Dinophysis reticulata Gaarder
- Dinophysis robusta Gran & Braarud
- Dinophysis rotundiformis L.-S.Tai & T.Skogsberg
- Dinophysis rudgei Murray & Whitting
- Dinophysis rugosa Kofoid & Michener
- Dinophysis sacculus Stein
- Dinophysis scabra Sournia
- Dinophysis schilleri Sournia
- Dinophysis schroederi Pavillard
- Dinophysis schuettii Murray & Whitting
- Dinophysis semen Meunier
- Dinophysis siankanensis Almazán & Hernández-Becerril
- Dinophysis similis Kofoid & Skogsberg
- Dinophysis simplex Böhm
- Dinophysis sourniai Balech
- Dinophysis sphaerica Stein
- Dinophysis sphaeroidea (J.Schiller) Balech
- Dinophysis spinata (N.Peters) Balech
- Dinophysis spinosa Rampi
- Dinophysis subcircularis Paulsen
- Dinophysis swezyae Kofoid & Skogsberg
- Dinophysis symmetrica (Gaarder) Balech
- Dinophysis tailisunii Chen & Ni
- Dinophysis taylorii Hernandez-Becerril
- Dinophysis tenuivelata Balech
- Dinophysis thompsonii (E.J.F.Wood) Balech
- Dinophysis trapezium Kofoid & Skogsberg
- Dinophysis triacantha Kofoid
- Dinophysis tripos Gourret
- Dinophysis truncata Cleve
- Dinophysis tuberculata Mangin
- Dinophysis umbosa Schiller
- Dinophysis uracantha Stein
- Dinophysis uracanthoides (Jorgensen) F.Gomez, P.Lopez-Garcia & D.Moreira
- Dinophysis urceola Kofoid & Skogsberg
- Dinophysis vasta (F.Schütt) Balech
- Dinophysis ventricosa Claparède & Lachmann
- Dinophysis vermiculata C.-H.-G.Pouchet
- Dinophysis vertex Meunier
