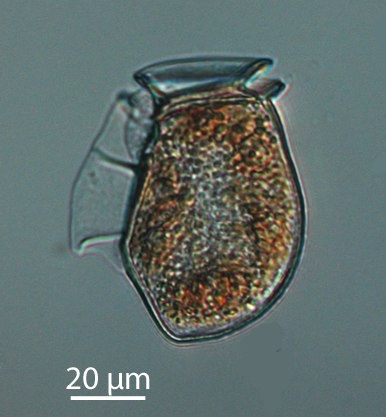
- Dinophysis acuta

Scientific classification
- Domain: Eukaryota
- Clade: Diaphoretickes
- Clade: SAR
- Clade: Alveolata
- Phylum: Myzozoa
- Superclass: Dinoflagellata
- Class: Dinophyceae
- Order: Dinophysiales
- Family: Dinophysaceae; Bütschli

Genera
- See text

= Dinophysaceae =

Family of single-celled organism

Dinophysaceae is a family of dinoflagellates in the class Dinophyceae.

== Genera ==
According to the World Register of Marine Species, the following species are accepted within:

- Citharistes Stein
- Dinoceras Schiller
- Dinofurcula Kofoid & Skogsberg
- Dinophysis Ehrenberg
- Heteroschisma Kofoid & Skogsberg
- Histioneis Stein
- Ichthyodinium Hollande & J.Cachon
- Metaphalacroma Tai & Skogsberg
- Ornithocercus Stein
- Sinophysis Nie & C.Wang
- Thaumatodinium A.Böhm
