= Plankton net =

Equipment to collect plankton

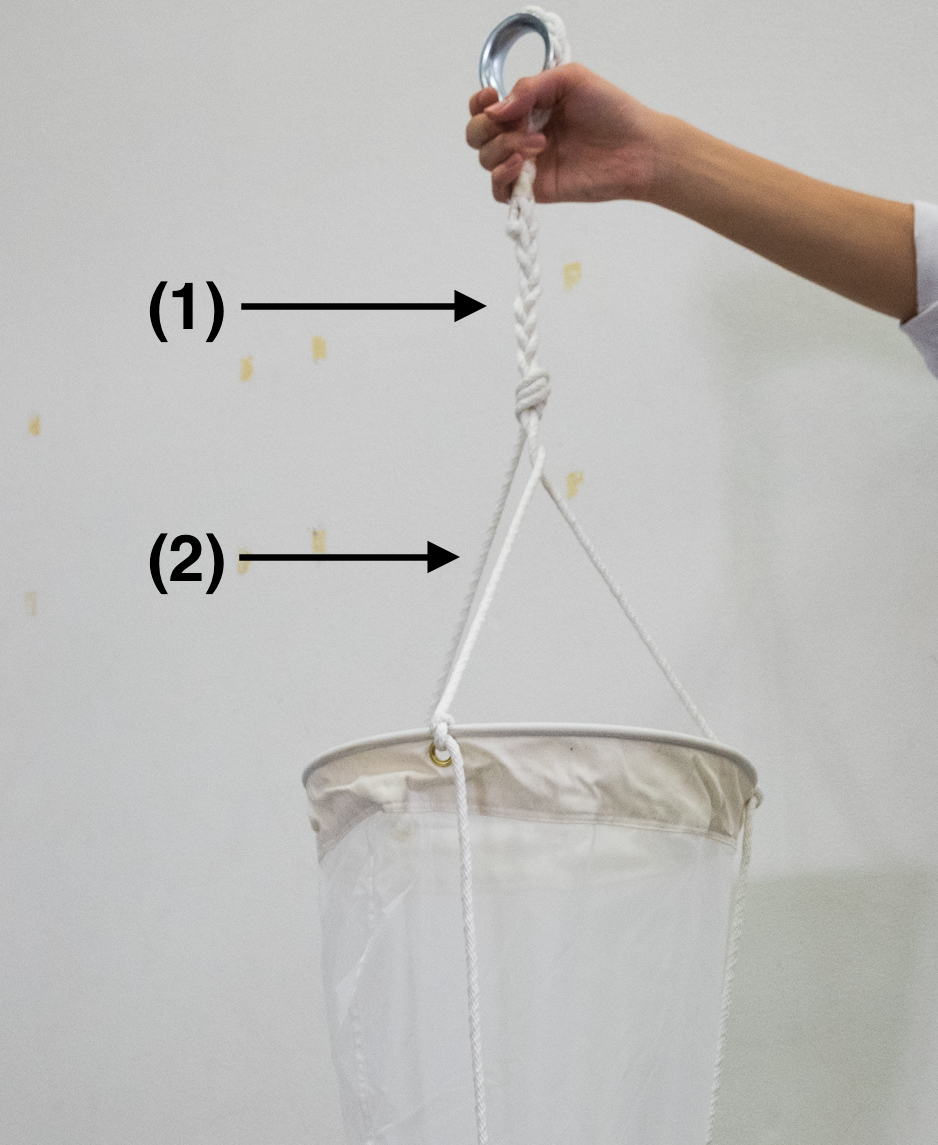
The upper part of a plankton net consisting of (1) towing line connected to (2) three-point bridle, which are responsible for holding the plankton net

A plankton net is equipment used for collecting samples of plankton in standing bodies of water. It consists of a towing line and bridles, nylon mesh net, and a cod end. Plankton nets are considered one of the oldest, simplest and least expensive methods of sampling plankton. The plankton net can be used for both vertical and horizontal sampling. It allows researchers to analyse plankton both quantitatively (cell density, cell colony or biomass) and qualitatively (e.g. Chlorophyll-a as a primary production of phytoplankton) in water samples from the environment.

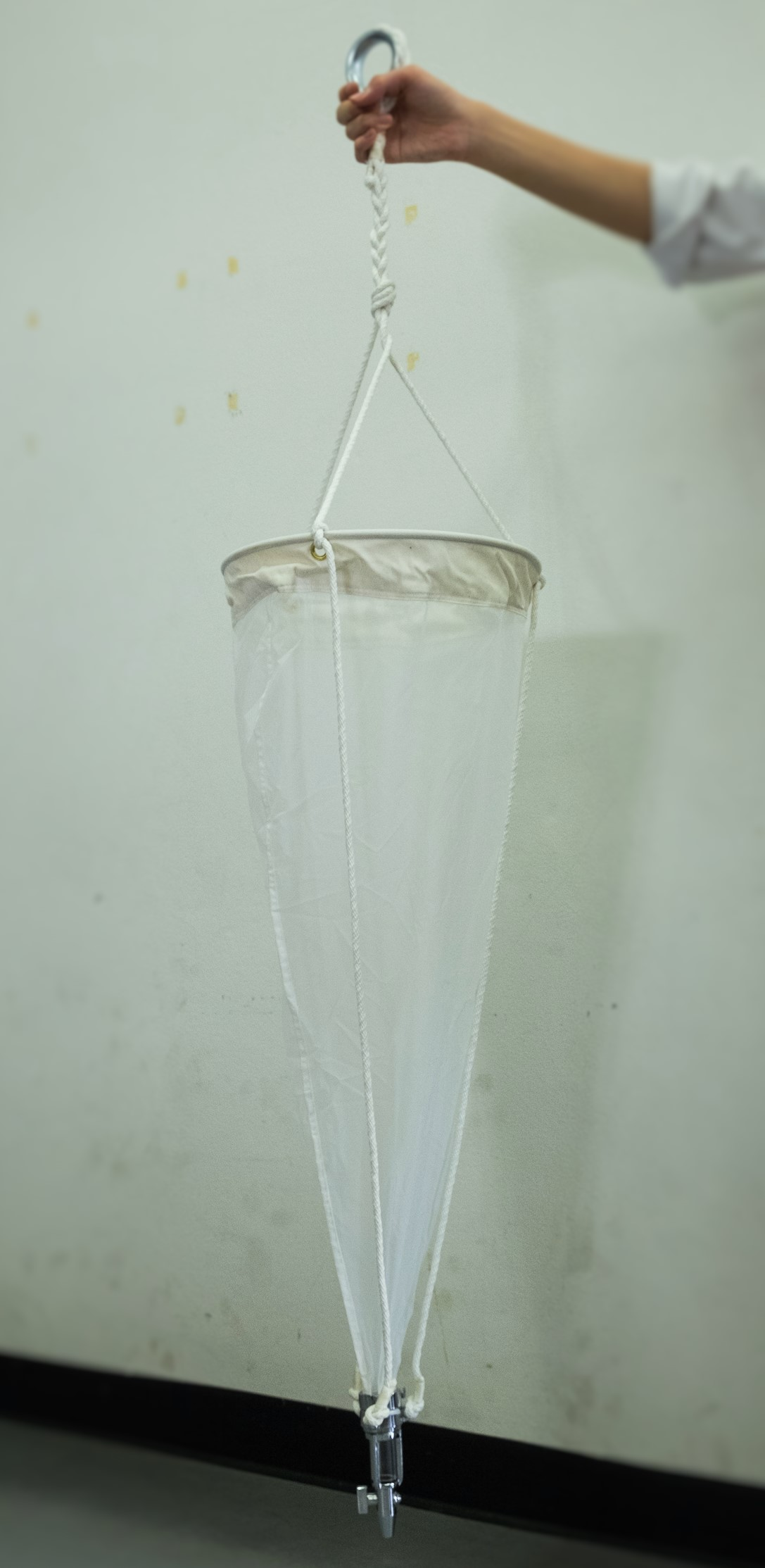
A simple plankton net

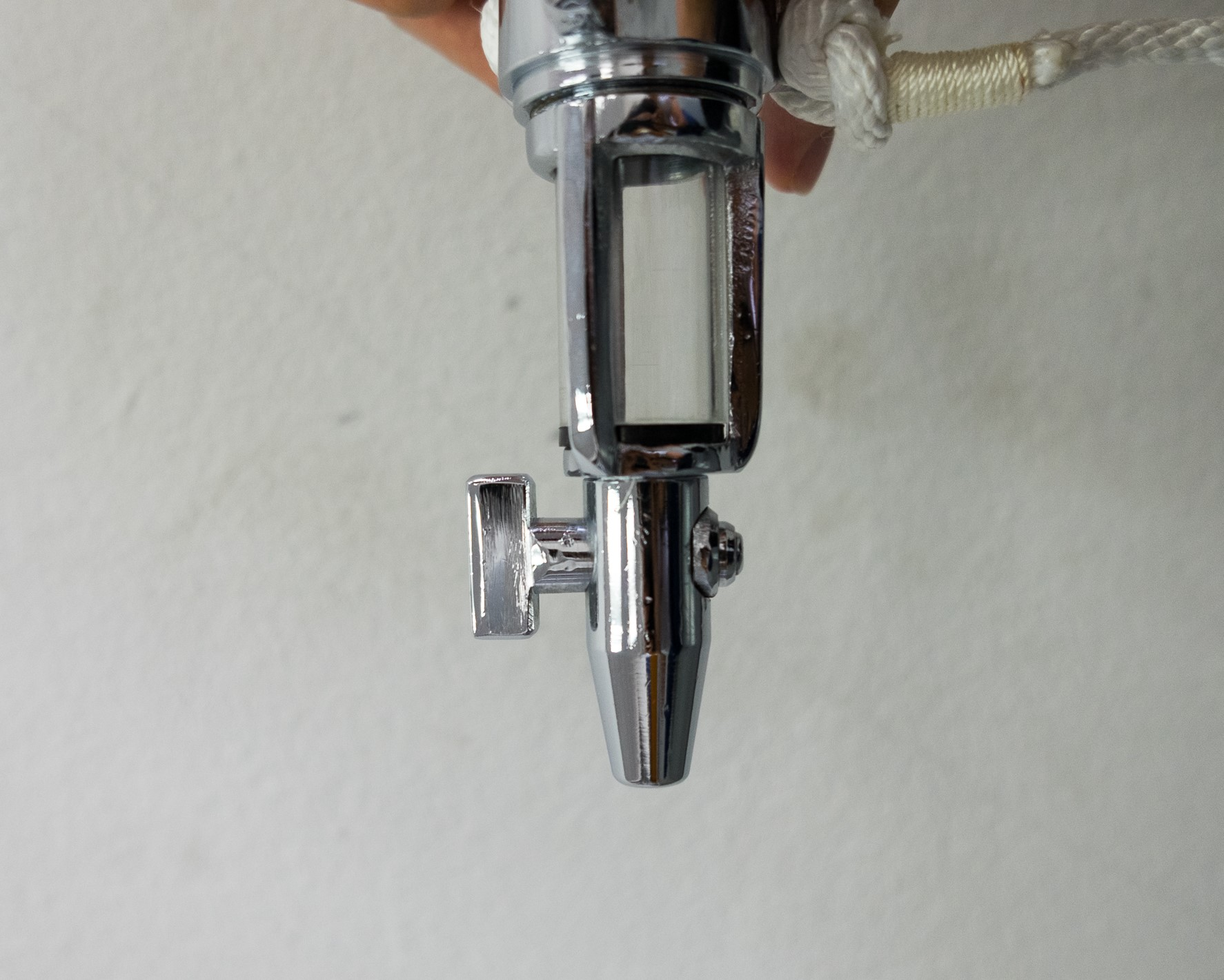
Cod end—an outlet valve with collecting cylinder

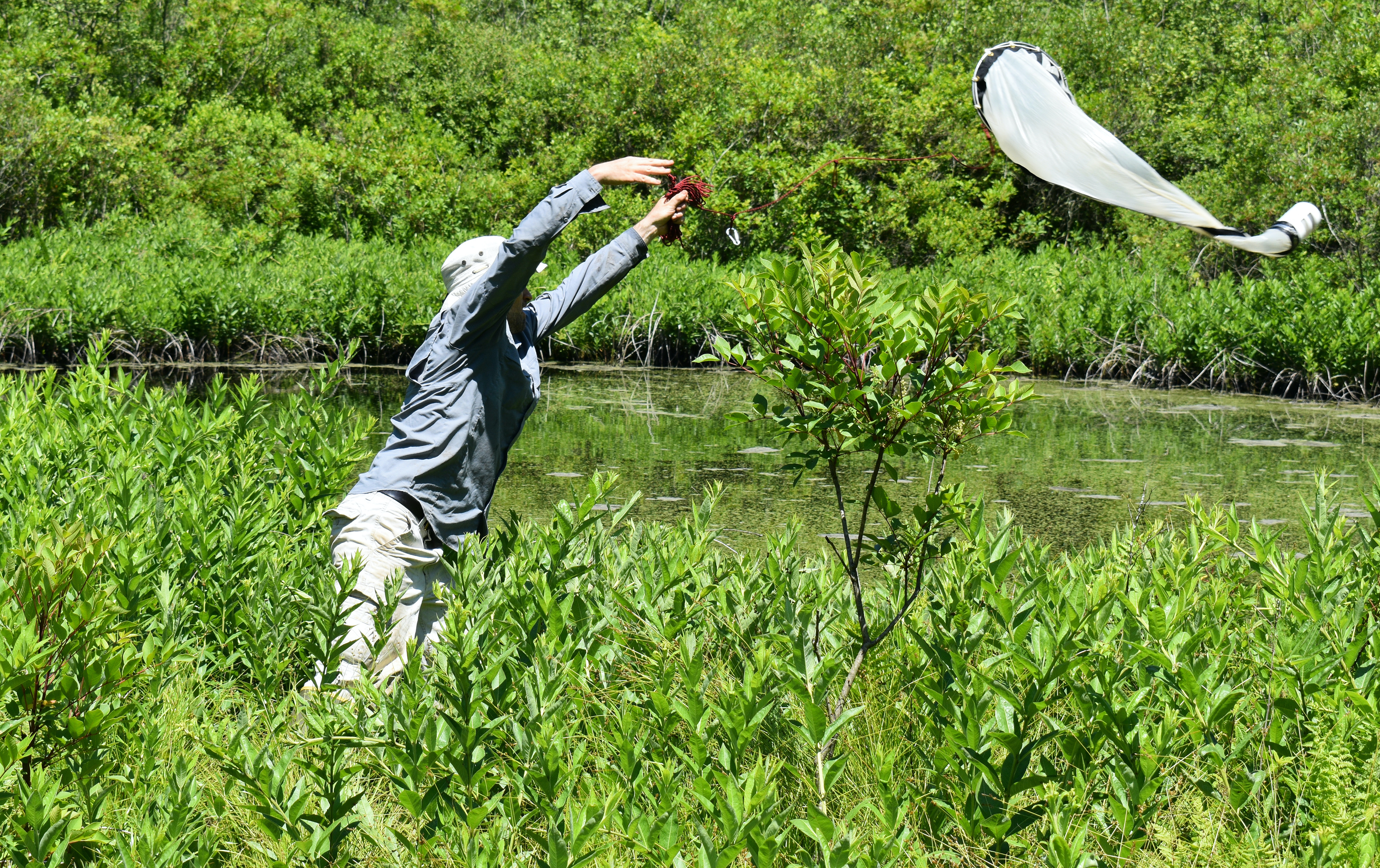
Aquatic scientist casting a plankton net in Brown's Lake Bog.

== Components ==
Towing line and bridle
The towing line and bridle is the upper part of a plankton net and used to hold it. The towing lines connected to the triangle bridles are made of nylon rope and can be adjust to a level suitable for the user.
Nylon mesh net
The nylon mesh net is the middle part of the plankton net and is used to filter the plankton in the water sample in accordance with the size of the mesh. In addition, its funnel shape makes it possible to effectively capture plankton of various sizes. There are various mesh sizes for nets, depending on the target microorganism to be collected and the condition of the water body. The narrower the mesh size, the smaller the plankton in the water sample.
For example, in order to obtain small invertebrates measuring 50 to 1500 μm, a net mesh size between 25 and 50 μm diameter should be selected, which is sufficient to effectively filter only the target organism. However, in a eutrophic water condition, a plankton net with a mesh larger than 100 μm should be chosen to avoid clogging the net.
Cod end
The cod end is located in the lower part of the plankton net at the end of the funnel. It has a collecting cylinder and a valve for opening and closing it.

== Use ==
One common method for collecting a plankton sample is to tow the net horizontally using a low-speed boat. Before collecting the plankton, the net should be rinsed with the sample water. The user should ensure that the cod end is completely closed by turning the valve into a vertical position. Then the plankton net is then lowered horizontal to the water surface at the side of the slowly moving boat. Sampling is done for 1.5 minutes. After this time, the plankton sample is collected in a sample bottle by opening the cod end above it by turning the valve horizontally.

When the sample is collected it can be analyzed using a microscope to identify the type of zooplankton or phytoplankton, or a cell count can be undertaken to determine the plankton cell density of the water source.

== History ==
John Vaughan Thompson developed a plankton net during his return voyage from Mauritius, which reached the UK in 1816. Impressed by marine bioluminescence in small crustacea he later named Sapphirina, he felt "under great obligations to this beautiful little animal, which by its splendid appearance in the water induced me to commence the use of a muslin hoop-net, which when it failed to procure me a specimen, brought up such a profusion of other marine animals altogether invisible while in the sea, as to induce a continued use of it on every favourable opportunity." He published his research in a series of six memoirs from 1828 to 1834.

The second recorded use of a plankton net was by Charles Darwin on 10 January 1832, during the Beagle survey voyage. His diary included a sketch of the net, which appears to have been based on a trawl net described by John Coldstream in a letter to Darwin. It is possible that Thompson's idea had earlier been drawn to Darwin's attention by Robert Edmond Grant in Edinburgh. Darwin describes this "contrivance" as "a bag four feet deep, made of bunting, & attached to [a] semicircular bow this by lines is kept upright, & dragged behind the vessel". The next day he remarked that "The number of animals that the net collects is very great & fully explains the manner so many animals of a large size live so far from land. — Many of these creatures so low in the scale of nature are most exquisite in their forms & rich colours. — It creates a feeling of wonder that so much beauty should be apparently created for such little purpose."

== See also ==
- Ichthyoplankton sampling methods
- Continuous Plankton Recorder
- Video plankton recorder
