= BIONESS =

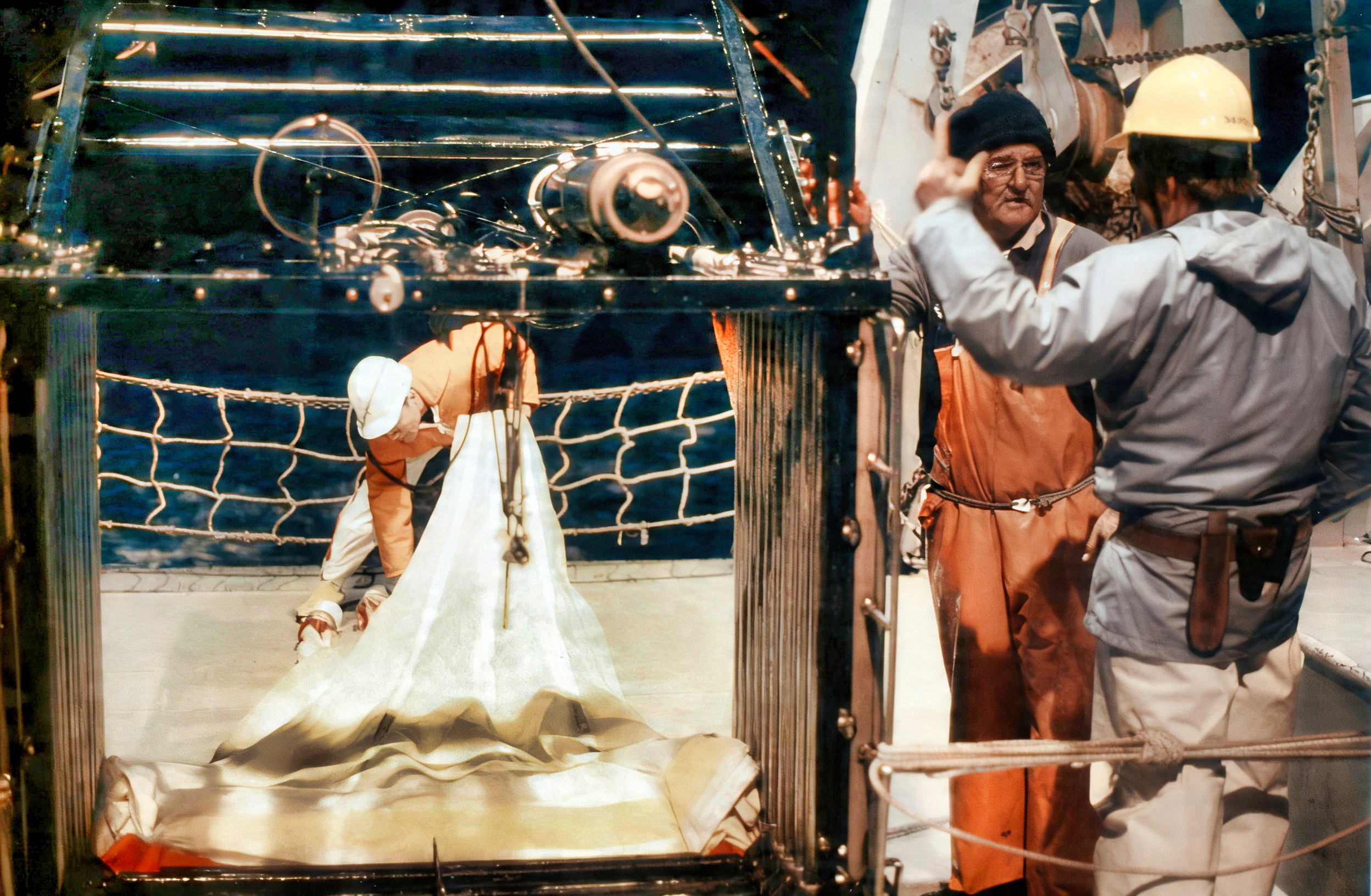
Southern Surveyor voyage 1993-04: EZ net (=BIONESS) night-time retrieval

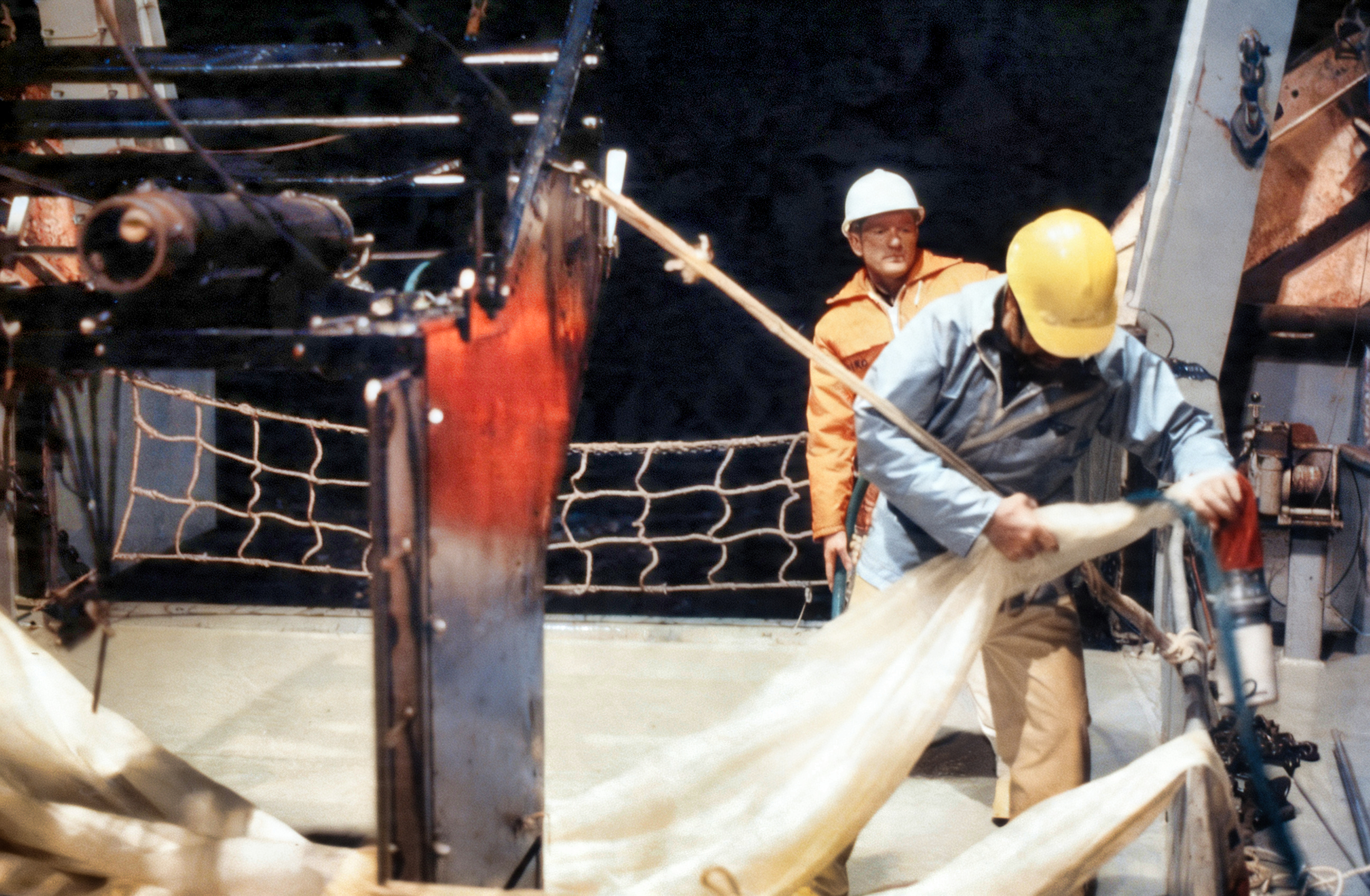
Southern Surveyor voyage 1993-04: EZ net (=BIONESS) night-time retrieval (2)

The BIONESS (acronym for Bedford Institute of Oceanography Net and Environmental Sampling System), also produced commercially under the name EZ Net (for Easy Zooplankton net) is a towed net system comprising multiple opening and closing nets for the collection of plankton and micronekton in the ocean. It comprises a set of ten nets of user selected mesh sizes, and is useful for collecting samples at multiple depths and sizes. It is designed to sample waters in a similar manner to the MOCNESS system but with a reduced front profile for improved streamlining/reduced net avoidance, also permitting it to be towed at a higher speed through the water if needed. A range of sensors on the unit provide real time data to the towing vessel via a multicore cable, which is also used to control the opening and closing of individual nets. A particular application of such systems is to investigate the vertical distribution of zooplankton in the water column, which exhibit a behaviour known as diel vertical migration and move up or down according to the time of day.

== Design and usage ==
The system was developed at the Bedford Institute of Oceanography in Canada from 1977 onwards as an improvement on the MOCNESS system developed by P. Wiebe et al. at Woods Hole Oceanographic Institution; a technical description was published in 1979 and a more condensed overview of the instrument by Sameoto et al., 1980. It is towed behind a research vessel at a speed of up to 4 knots (2.1 m/s) and consists of ten nets with a user supplied mesh size from c.250 μm to 1000 μm which are opened and closed by computer control at desired target depth. The net enables biologists to catch zooplankton and nekton in various depth horizons typically anywhere in the upper 5000 m of the oceans. The system includes instrumentation to measure salinity and temperature at sampling depths, and transmit these values to the towing vessel in real time, in addition to electronic flowmeters which calculate the total volume of water passing through the mouth of the net. As with the MOCNESS system, the type of sampling is described as "obliquely, horizontally integrating", as compared to, for example, the horizontal integration of the Continuous Plankton Recorder, or the vertical integration of non opening/closing net systems. A commercial version of the apparatus, designated the EZ Net (or EZNet, or E-Z-Net), acronym for Easy Zooplankton Net, is (or was) manufactured by Eastern Marine Services, Dartmouth, Nova Scotia. The Australian (CSIRO) Division of Fisheries's Soela and its associated and successor vessels including Southern Surveyor, Franklin and Investigator have deployed an EZ Net on a number of research voyages for trials and then study of zooplankton dynamics since at least 1986, and an upgraded version of the EZ Net (therein simply called the "multinet system") is currently (2026) available as part of the equipment complement for users of the Investigator. Some comparative performance characteristics between the BIONESS and MOCNESS systems have been given here.

== Example deployments ==
In the first ten years since its release, the BIONESS was used mainly in Canadian waters including studies in the Canadian Arctic. In the 1990s, BIONESS units were deployed further afield including Europe, South America and the Australian region, a pattern that has continued into the 2000s. Example images from a 2015 research cruise by the Australian vessel Investigator are included here.

== Terminology ==
Although, as with MOCNESS, BIONESS aka the EZ Net is conceptually another instance of a "Multiple Opening and Closing Net and Environmental Sensors", the acronym MOCNESS should be reserved for the Woods Hole-designed instrument and BIONESS (or EZ Net) used for the present apparatus as described here. The conflation of the two terms in certain presently available web descriptions is thus misleading, since the two systems are not the same.

== See also ==
- MOCNESS
- Zooplankton
- Ichthyoplankton
- Plankton
