= FishBase =

Biological database about fish

Content
- Description: A large and extensively accessed biological database about fish
- Data types captured: Comprehensive species data, including taxonomy, biometrics, behaviour, distribution, habitats and photos
- Organisms: Adult fish species (finfish)

Contact
- Research center: GEOMAR Helmholtz Centre for Ocean Research Kiel, FishBase Consortium coordinator
- Authors: Daniel Pauly, Rainer Froese

Access
- Website: fishbase.us

Tools
- Standalone: Historic versions available on CD

Miscellaneous
- License: CC-BY-NC for data; various levels of licensing for media files (pictures, sounds, ...) to be checked case by case
- Versioning: Every even month of the year
- Data release frequency: Continuously updated
- Version: Latest version: 04/2025
- Curation policy: FishBase Consortium
- Bookmarkable entities: Yes

FishBase is a global species database of fish species (specifically finfish). It is the largest and most extensively accessed online database on adult finfish on the web. Over time it has "evolved into a dynamic and versatile ecological tool" that is widely cited in scholarly publications.

FishBase provides comprehensive species data, including information on taxonomy, geographical distribution, biometrics and morphology, behaviour and habitats, ecology and population dynamics as well as reproductive, metabolic and genetic data. There is access to tools such as trophic pyramids, identification keys, biogeographical modelling and fishery statistics and there are direct species level links to information in other databases such as LarvalBase, GenBank, the IUCN Red List and the Catalog of Fishes.

As of February 2024, FishBase included descriptions of 36,100 species and subspecies, with 332,100 common names, 65,300 pictures, and references to 67,600 works in the scientific literature. The site has about 700,000 visits per month.

== History ==
The origins of FishBase go back to the 1970s, when the fisheries scientist Daniel Pauly found himself struggling to test a hypothesis on how the growing ability of fish was affected by the size of their gills. Hypotheses, such as this one, could be tested only if large amounts of empirical data were available. At the time, fisheries management used analytical models which required estimates for fish growth and mortality. It can be difficult for fishery scientists and managers to get the information they need on the species that concern them, because the relevant facts can be scattered across and buried in numerous journal articles, reports, newsletters and other sources. It can be particularly difficult for people in developing countries who need such information. Pauly believed that the only practical way fisheries managers could access the volume of data they needed was to assemble and consolidate all the data available in the published literature into some central and easily accessed repository. Such a database would be particularly useful if the data has also been standardised and validated. This would mean that when scientists or managers need to test a new hypothesis, the available data will already be there in a validated and accessible form, and there will be no need to create a new dataset and then have to validate it.

Pauly recruited Rainer Froese, and the beginnings of a software database along these lines was encoded in 1988. This database, initially confined to tropical fish, became the prototype for FishBase. FishBase was subsequently extended to cover all finfish, and was launched on the Web in August 1996. It is now the largest and most accessed online database for fish in the world. In 1995 the first CD-ROM was released as "FishBase 100". Subsequent CDs have been released annually. The software runs on Microsoft Access which operates only on Microsoft Windows.

FishBase covers adult finfish, but does not detail the early and juvenile stages of fish. In 1999 a complementary database, called LarvalBase, went online under the supervision of Bernd Ueberschär. It covers ichthyoplankton and the juvenile stage of fishes, with detailed data on fish eggs and larvae, fish identification, as well as data relevant to the rearing of young fish in aquaculture. Given FishBase's success, there was a demand for a database covering forms of aquatic life other than finfish. This resulted, in 2006, in the birth of SeaLifeBase. The long-term goal of SeaLifeBase is to develop an information system modelled on FishBase, but including all forms of aquatic life, both marine and freshwater, apart from the finfish which FishBase specialises in. Altogether, there are about 300,000 known species in this category.

== Organization ==
As awareness of FishBase has grown among fish specialists, it has attracted over 2,480 contributors and collaborators. Since 2000 FishBase has been supervised by a consortium of nine international institutions. The FishBase consortium has grown to twelve members. The GEOMAR – Helmholtz Centre for Ocean Research for Ocean Research Kiel (GEOMAR) in Germany, functions as the coordinating body and, since February 2017, Quantitative Aquatics, Inc. functions as the administrative body.

The FishBase Consortium

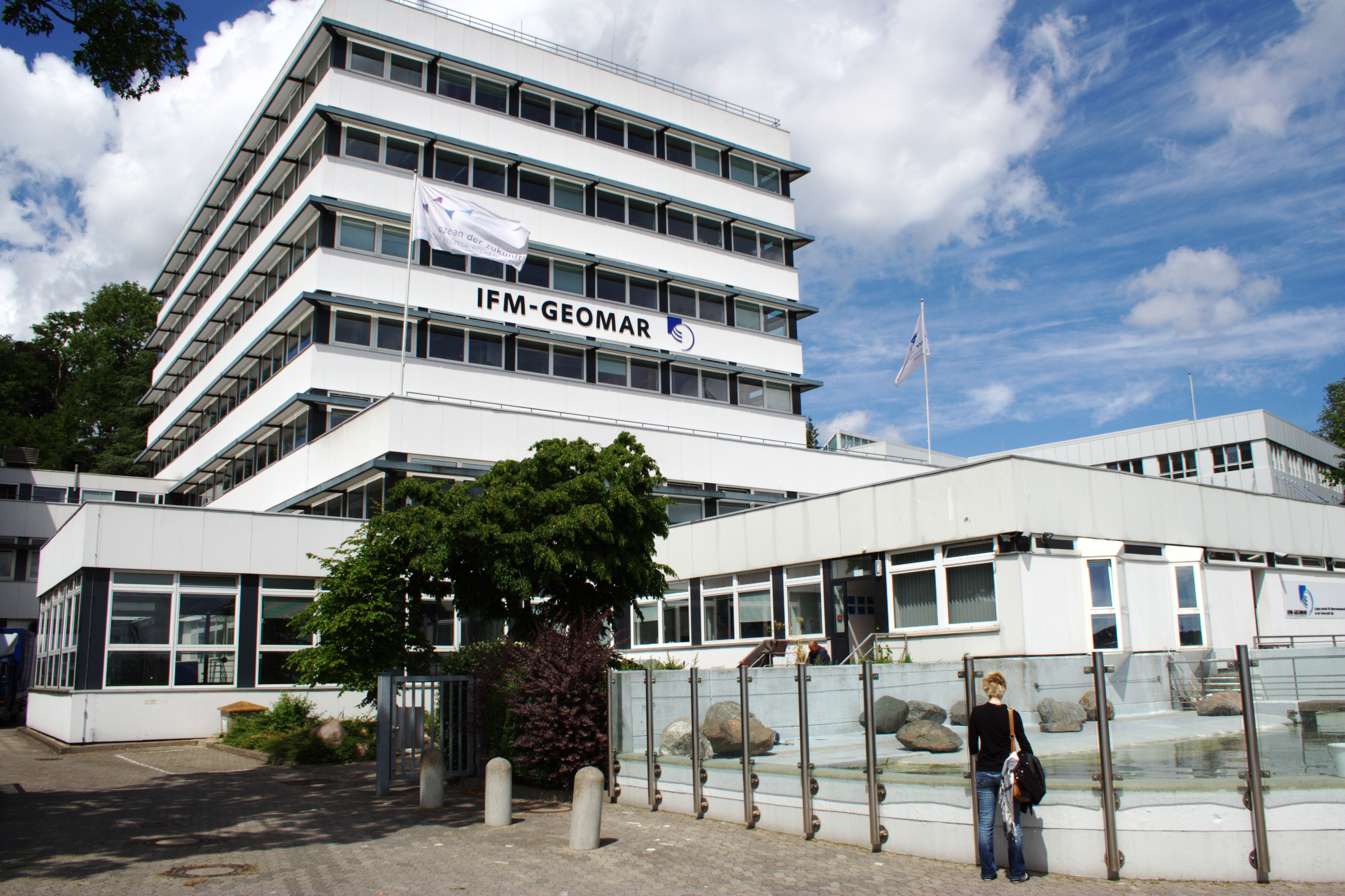
The GEOMAR Helmholtz Centre for Ocean Research Kiel coordinates the FishBase Consortium

Aristotle University of Thessaloniki, Thessaloniki, Greece
Chinese Academy of Fishery Science, Beijing, China
Institute for the Oceans and Fisheries, University of British Columbia, Vancouver, Canada
Food and Agriculture Organization, Rome, Italy
Muséum National d'Histoire Naturelle, Paris, France
Royal Museum for Central Africa, Tervuren, Belgium
Swedish Museum of Natural History, Stockholm, Sweden
WorldFish, Penang, Malaysia
Universidade Federal de Sergipe, São Cristóvão – SE, Brazil
University of Western Australia, Perth, Australia
Quantitative Aquatics, Incorporated, Laguna, Philippines

== See also ==
- Catalog of Fishes
- List of online encyclopedias
