= SeaLifeBase =

Global online database of information about marine life

Content
- Description: A global online database of information about aquatic species
- Data types captured: Scientific and common names, distribution and ecology
- Organisms: All aquatic species, except finfish

Contact
- Research center: Sea Around Us Project
- Authors: Daniel Pauly; Maria Lourdes D. Palomares

Access
- Website: www.sealifebase.org

Miscellaneous
- License: CC-BY-NC
- Data release frequency: Continuously updated
- Bookmarkable entities: Yes

SeaLifeBase is a global online database of information about marine life. It aims to provide key information on the taxonomy, distribution and ecology of all marine species in the world apart from finfish. SeaLifeBase is in partnership with the WorldFish Center in Malaysia and the UBC Institute for the Oceans and Fisheries at the University of British Columbia. Daniel Pauly is the principal investigator and it is coordinated by Maria Lourdes D. Palomares. As of March 2023, it included descriptions of 85,000 species, 59,400 common names, 15,500 pictures, and references to 39,300 works in the scientific literature. SeaLifeBase complements FishBase, which provides parallel information for finfish.

== History ==
The origins of SeaLifeBase go back to the 1970s, when the fisheries scientist Daniel Pauly found himself struggling to test a hypothesis on how the growing ability of fish was affected by the size of their gills. Hypotheses, such as this one, could be tested only if large amounts of empirical data were available. At the time, fisheries management used analytical models which required estimates for fish growth and mortality. Pauly believed that the only practical way fisheries managers could access the volume of data they needed was to assemble all the data available in the published literature into some central repository. This would mean that when a new hypothesis needs to be tested, the available data will already be there in a validated and accessible form, and there will be no need create a new dataset and then have to validate it. Pauly recruited Rainer Froese, and the beginnings of a software database along these lines was encoded in 1988. This database, initially confined to tropical fish, became the prototype for FishBase. FishBase was extended to cover all finfish, and is now the largest online database for fish in the world.

Given FishBase's success, there was naturally a demand for a database covering forms of aquatic life other than finfish. This resulted, in 2006, in the birth of SeaLifeBase. The long-term goal of the project is develop an information system modelled on FishBase, but including all forms of aquatic life, both marine and freshwater, apart from the finfish which FishBase specialises in. Altogether, there are about are 300,000 known species in this category

== See also ==
- LarvalBase
- List of online encyclopedias
