= LarvalBase =

Content
- Description: A global online database about ichthyoplankton and fish fry
- Data types captured: Scientific and common names, distribution and ecology
- Organisms: Fish eggs, larvae and fry

Contact
- Research center: Leibniz Institute of Marine Sciences
- Authors: Bernd Ueberschaer

Access
- Website: www.larvalbase.org

Tools
- Standalone: Historic versions available on CD

Miscellaneous
- License: CC-BY-NC
- Data release frequency: Infrequently updated
- Bookmarkable entities: Yes

LarvalBase is a global online database of information about fish eggs, larvae and fry. It includes detailed data on the identification of very young fish and the rearing of fish species important for fisheries and aquaculture. As of July 2011, it included descriptions of 2,228 species, 4,229 pictures, and references to 4,513 works in the scientific literature. The database is under the supervision of Bernd Ueberschaer at the Leibniz Institute of Marine Sciences in Kiel, Germany.

LarvalBase is an offshoot of, and follows the same format as FishBase, a comprehensive online database about finfish. Whereas FishBase is a database about adult finfish, LarvalBase is a database about the juvenile stages of fish. Juvenile fish often feed differently and occupy different habitats than the adults do. LarvalBase complements FishBase by providing information about these early stages of life.

LarvalBase aims to include all the key data on finfish larvae, with an emphasis on standardising the data, making it easy to extract and combine data with other data, and offering powerful presentation tools. It draws on the traditional primary sources found in papers, books and reports, gray literature and unpublished but reliable data from sources such as practicing aquaculturists. The data includes information such as identification keys, morphometrics, broodstock, spawning and nursery behaviour, prey and predators, and growth stages and rates. It also includes information of specific interest to aquaculturists, such as how long it takes egg to hatch, diagrams charting changes in anatomy at different larval stages, analysis of larval diets, and techniques for rearing fish fry.

== Background ==
It can be difficult for fisheries, aquaculture and hatchery scientists and managers to get the information they need on the species that concern them, because the relevant facts can be scattered and buried across numerous journal articles, reports, newsletters and other sources. It can be particularly difficult for people in developing countries who need such information. An answer to this situation is to consolidate all the available information, drawn from the global sources, into an easily accessed database. The database will be particularly useful if the data has also been standardised and validated. It was with such considerations that the FishBase project was born in 1988. FishBase is now the world's main database on finfish with over 30 million hits a month. However, FishBase does not include detailed information on fish eggs and juvenile fish. In 1998 the LarvalBase project was launched to remedy this.

== See also ==
- List of online encyclopedias
- SeaLifeBase
