= Ichthyoplankton =

Eggs and larvae of fish that drift in the water column

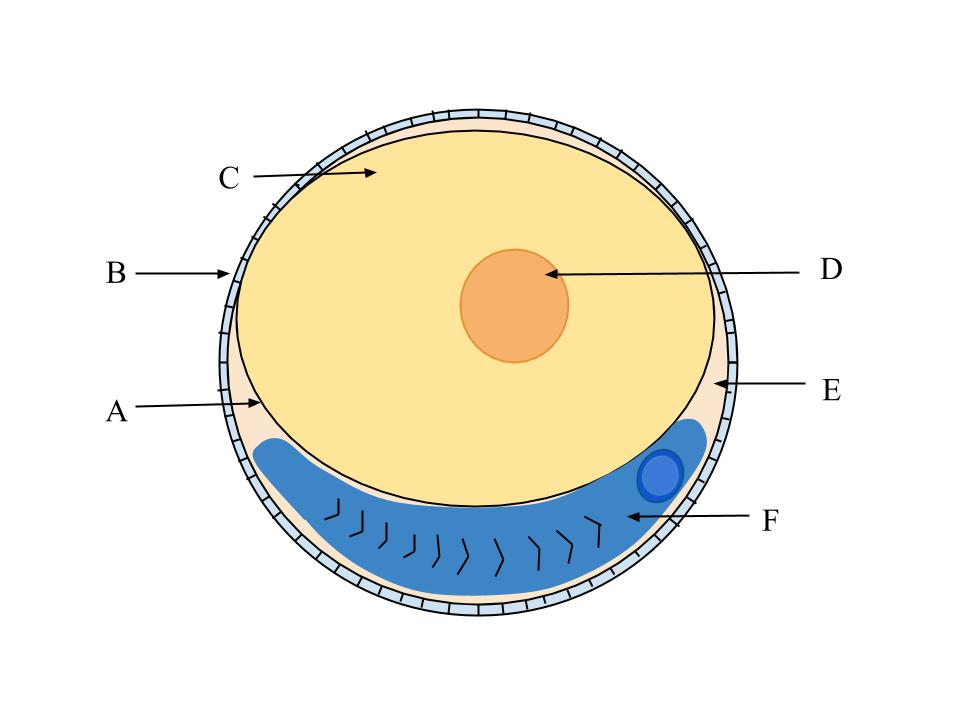
Diagram of a fish egg: A. vitelline membrane B. chorion C. yolk D. oil globule E. perivitelline space F. embryo Fish produce many eggs, typically about 1mm across, and usually release them into the open water column

Ichthyoplankton (from Greek: ἰχθύς, ikhthus, "fish"; and πλαγκτός, planktos, "drifter") are the eggs and larvae of fish. They are mostly found in the sunlit zone of the water column, less than 200 metres deep, which is sometimes called the epipelagic or photic zone. Ichthyoplankton are planktonic, meaning they cannot swim effectively under their own power, but must drift with the ocean currents. Fish eggs cannot swim at all, and are unambiguously planktonic. Early stage larvae swim poorly, but later stage larvae swim better and cease to be planktonic as they grow into juveniles. Fish larvae are part of the zooplankton that eat smaller plankton, while fish eggs carry their own food supply. Both eggs and larvae are themselves eaten by larger animals.

Fish can produce high numbers of eggs which are often released into the open water column. Fish eggs typically have a diameter of about 1 millimetre (0.039 in). The newly hatched young of oviparous fish are called larvae. They are usually poorly formed, carry a large yolk sac (for nourishment) and are very different in appearance from juvenile and adult specimens. The larval period in oviparous fish is relatively short (usually only several weeks), and larvae rapidly grow and change appearance and structure (a process termed metamorphosis) to become juveniles. During this transition larvae must switch from their yolk sac to feeding on zooplankton prey, a process which depends on typically inadequate zooplankton density, starving many larvae.

Ichthyoplankton can be a useful indicator of the state and health of an aquatic ecosystem. For instance, most late stage larvae in ichthyoplankton have usually been preyed on, so ichthyoplankton tends to be dominated by eggs and early stage larvae. This means that when fish, such as anchovies and sardines, are spawning, ichthyoplankton samples can reflect their spawning output and provide an index of relative population size for the fish. Increases or decreases in the number of adult fish stocks can be detected more rapidly and sensitively by monitoring the ichthyoplankton associated with them, compared to monitoring the adults themselves. It is also usually easier and more cost effective to sample trends in egg and larva populations than to sample trends in adult fish populations.

== History ==
Interest in plankton originated in Britain and Germany in the nineteenth century when researchers discovered there were microorganisms in the sea, and that they could trap them with fine-mesh nets. They started describing these microorganisms and testing different net configurations. Ichthyoplankton research started in 1864 when the Norwegian government commissioned the marine biologist G. O. Sars to investigate fisheries around the Norwegian coast. Sars found fish eggs, particularly cod eggs, drifting in the water. This established that fish eggs could be pelagic, living in the open water column like other plankton. Around the beginning of the twentieth century, research interest in ichthyoplankton became more general when it emerged that, if ichthyoplankton was sampled quantitatively, then the samples could indicate the relative size or abundance of spawning fish stocks.

== Sampling methods ==
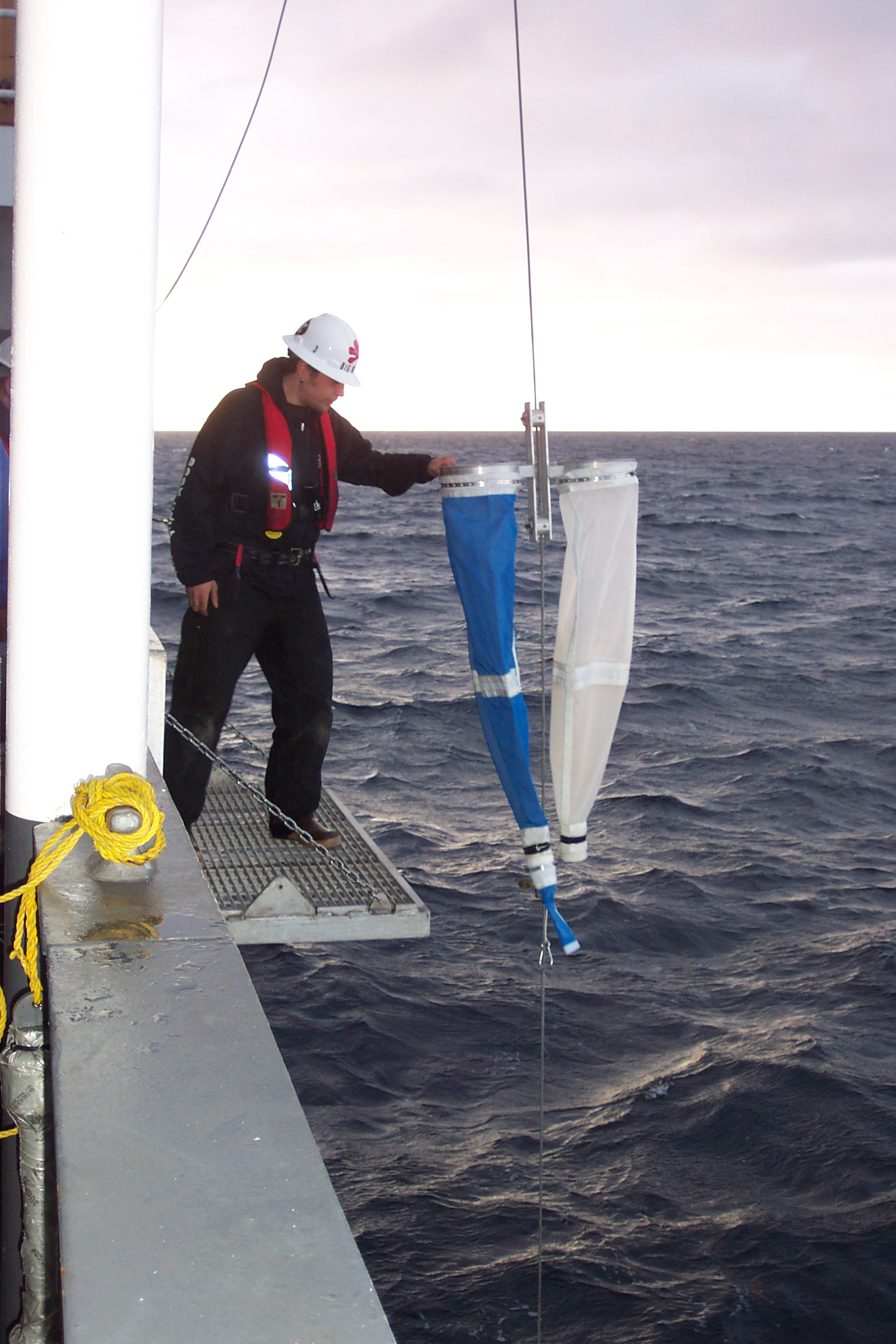
PairoVET tow

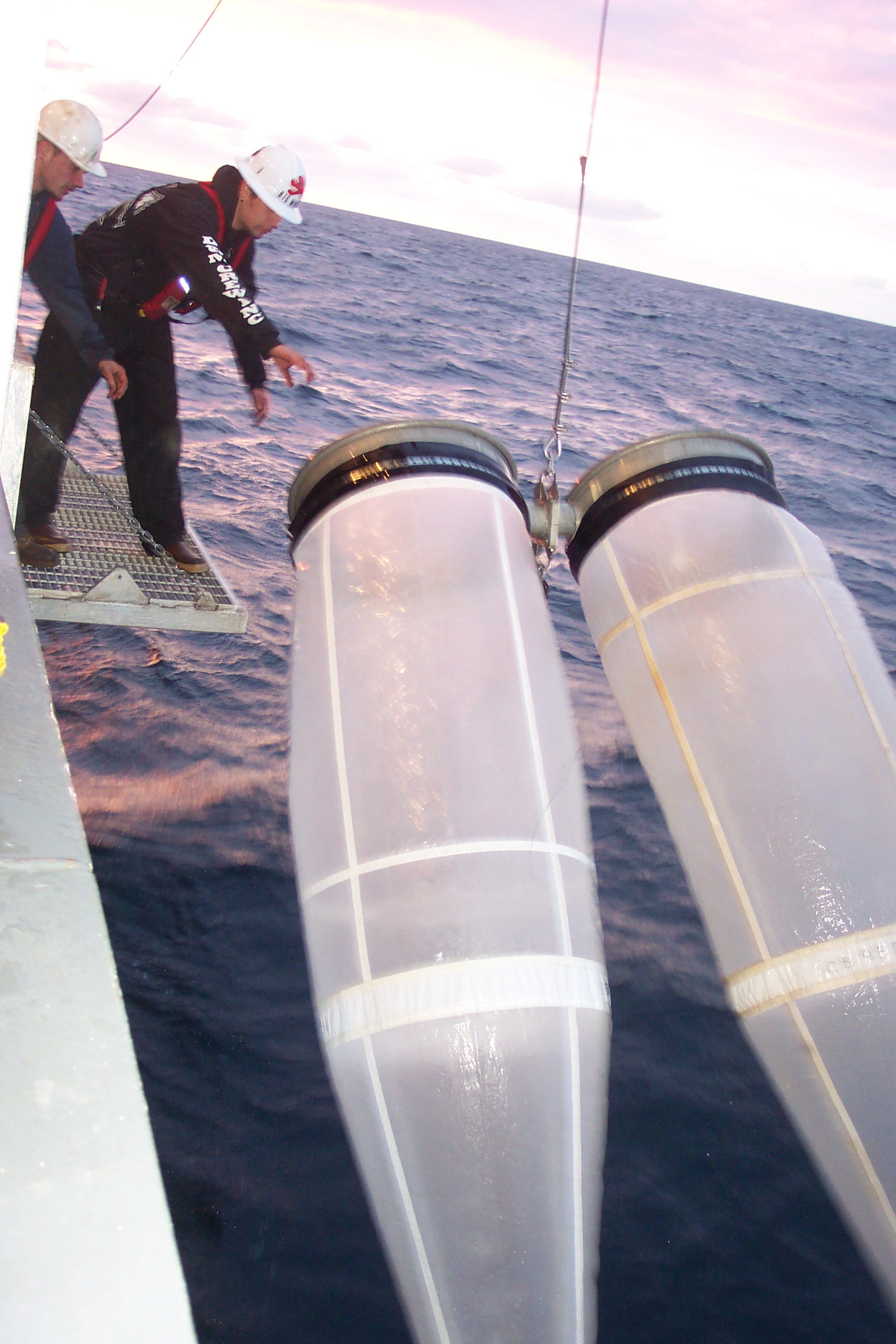
Bongo tow

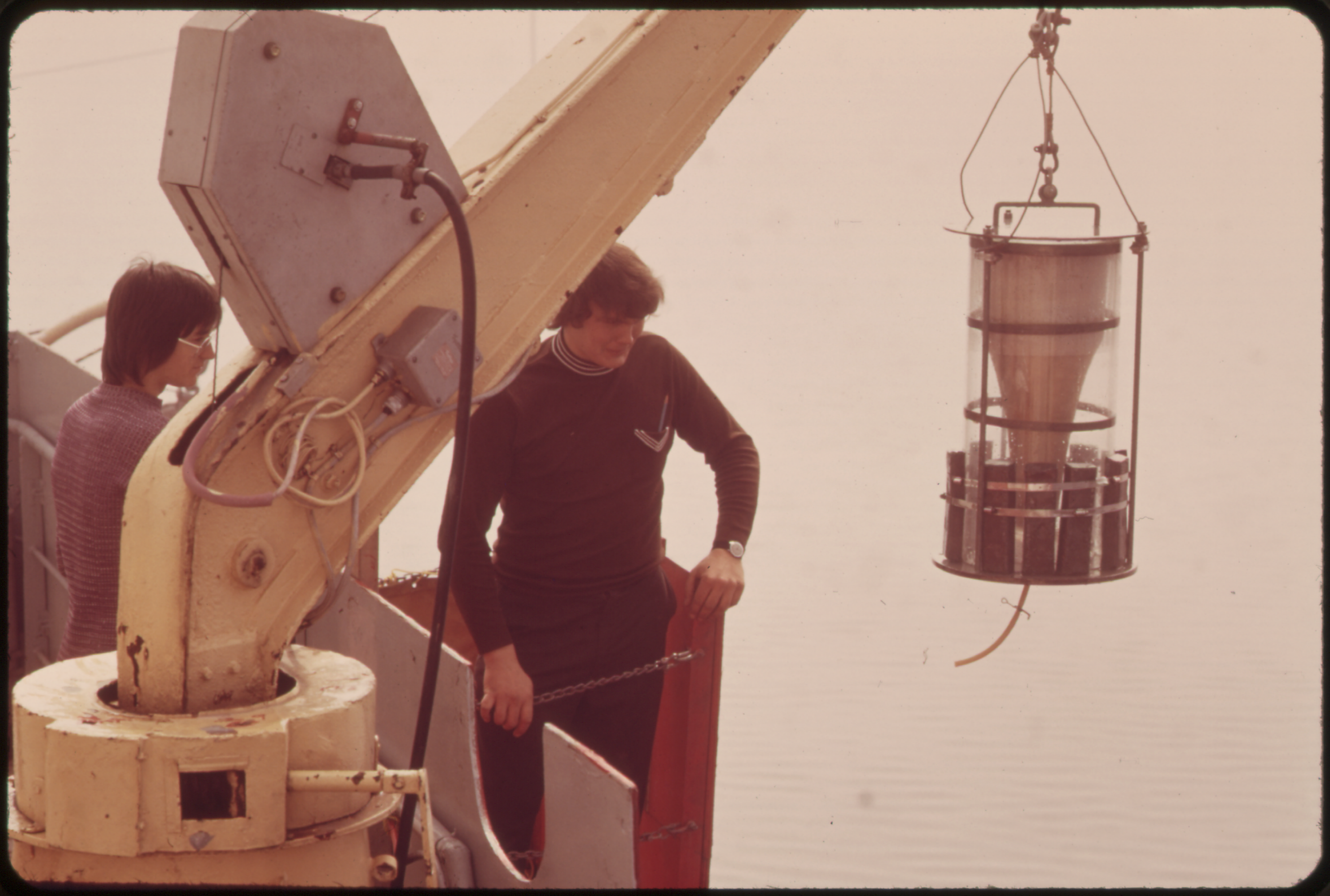
Retrieving a plankton sample

Research vessels collect ichthyoplankton from the ocean using fine mesh nets. The vessels either tow the nets through the sea or pump sea water onboard and then pass it through the net.

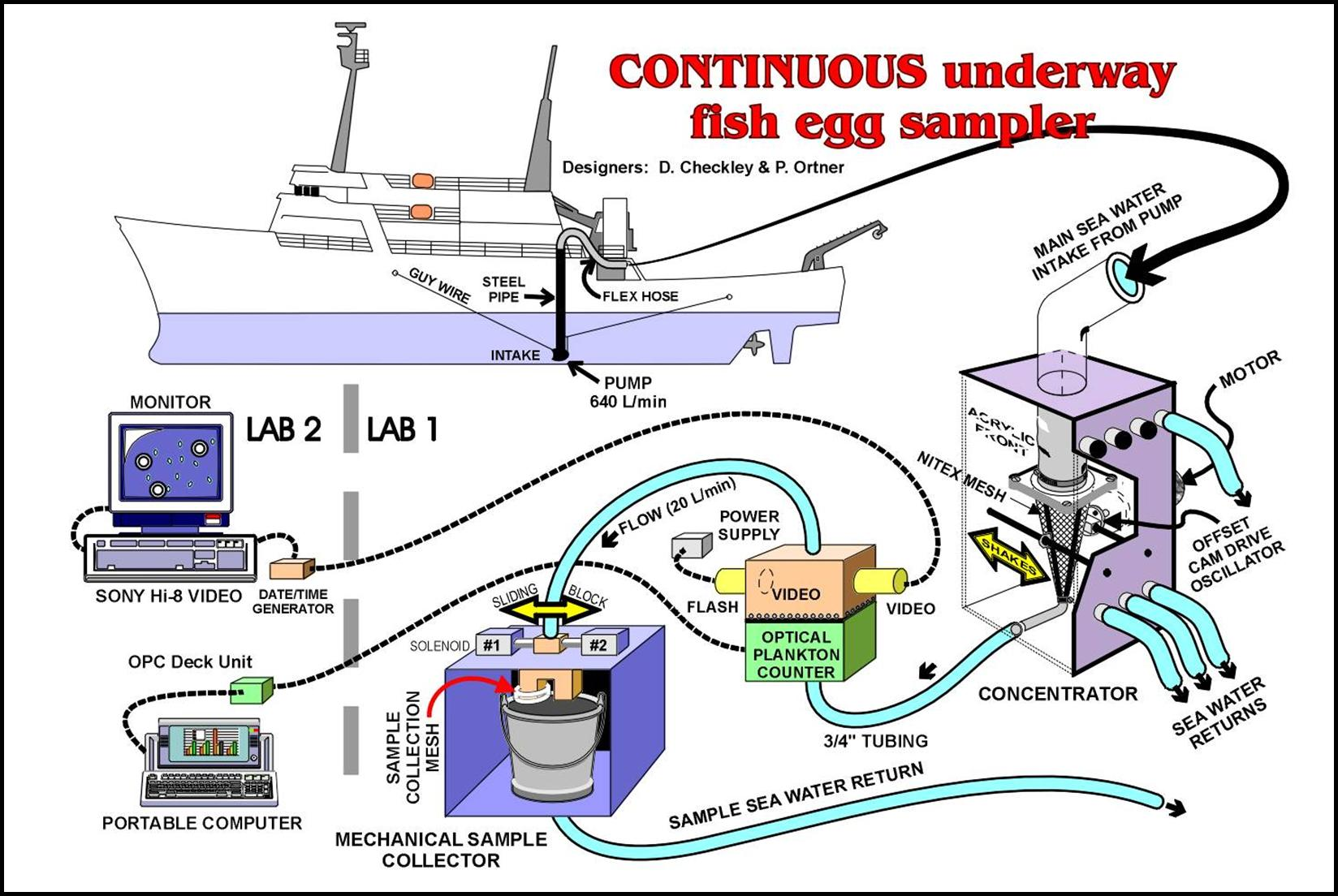
In addition to net tows, plankton is collected while the research vessel is moving using a Continuous Underway Fish Egg Sampler, or CUFES. Water is pumped aboard the vessel from 3 m depth at 640 liters/min. The water is sent through a concentrator where it passes through a net, and the plankton is diverted to a collector. While CUFES is running, a data logger is recording the date, time, and position for each sample as well as other environmental data from the ship's sensors (e.g. wind speed, direction, SST).

- There are many types of plankton tows:

- Neuston net tows are often made at or just below the surface using a nylon mesh net fitted to a rectangular frame
- The PairoVET tow, used for collecting fish eggs, drops a net about 70 metres into the sea from a stationary research vessel and then drags it back to the vessel.
- Ring net tows involve a nylon mesh net fitted to a circular frame. These have largely been replaced by bongo nets, which provide duplicate samples with their dual-net design.
- The bongo tow drags nets shaped like bongo drums from a moving vessel. The net is often lowered to about 200 metres and then allowed to rise to the surface as it is towed. In this way, a sample can be collected across the whole photic zone where most ichthyoplankton is found.
- MOCNESS and BIONESS tows and Tucker trawls utilize multiple nets that are mechanically opened and closed at discrete depths in order to provide insights into the vertical distribution of the plankton
- The manta trawl tows a net from a moving vessel along the surface of the water, collecting larvae, such as grunion, mahi-mahi, and flying fish which live at the surface.

After the tow the plankton is flushed with a hose to the cod end (bottom) of the net for collection. The sample is then placed in preservative fluid prior to being sorted and identified in a laboratory.

- Plankton pumps: Another method of collecting ichthyoplankton is to use a Continuous Underway Fish Egg Sampler (see illustration). Water from a depth of about three metres is pumped onto the vessel and filtered with a net. This method can be used while the vessel is underway.

== Developmental stages ==
Ichthyoplankton researchers generally use the terminology and development stages introduced in 1984 by Kendall and others. This consists of three main developmental stages and two transitional stages.

The spawn (eggs) of a clownfish. The black spots are the eyes developing. Salmon eggs. The growing larvae can be seen through the transparent egg envelope.	Developmental stages according to Kendall et al. 1984				Salmon egg hatching. The larva has broken through and is discarding the egg envelope. In about 24hrs it will absorb the remaining yolk sac and become a juvenile.
The spawn (eggs) of a clownfish. The black spots are the eyes developing. Salmon eggs. The growing larvae can be seen through the transparent egg envelope.	Main stages	Egg stage	Spawning to hatching. This stage is used instead of using an embryonic stage because there are aspects, such as those to do with the egg envelope, that are not just embryonic aspects.		Salmon egg hatching. The larva has broken through and is discarding the egg envelope. In about 24hrs it will absorb the remaining yolk sac and become a juvenile.
The spawn (eggs) of a clownfish. The black spots are the eyes developing. Salmon eggs. The growing larvae can be seen through the transparent egg envelope.	Main stages	Larval stage	From hatching until all fin rays are present and the growth of fish scales has started (squamation). A key event is when the notochord associated with the tail fin on the ventral side of the spinal cord develops flexion (becomes flexible).	The larval stage can be further subdivided into preflexion, flexion, and postflexion stages. In many species, the body shape and fin rays, as well as the ability to move and feed, develops most rapidly during the flexion stage.	Salmon egg hatching. The larva has broken through and is discarding the egg envelope. In about 24hrs it will absorb the remaining yolk sac and become a juvenile.
The spawn (eggs) of a clownfish. The black spots are the eyes developing. Salmon eggs. The growing larvae can be seen through the transparent egg envelope.	Main stages	Juvenile stage	Starts with all the fin rays being present and scale growth underway, and completes when the juvenile becomes sexually mature or starts interacting with other adults.		Salmon egg hatching. The larva has broken through and is discarding the egg envelope. In about 24hrs it will absorb the remaining yolk sac and become a juvenile.
The spawn (eggs) of a clownfish. The black spots are the eyes developing. Salmon eggs. The growing larvae can be seen through the transparent egg envelope.	Transitional stages	Yolk-sac larval stage	From hatching to absorption of the yolk-sac		Salmon egg hatching. The larva has broken through and is discarding the egg envelope. In about 24hrs it will absorb the remaining yolk sac and become a juvenile.
The spawn (eggs) of a clownfish. The black spots are the eyes developing. Salmon eggs. The growing larvae can be seen through the transparent egg envelope.	Transitional stages	Transformation stage	From larva to juvenile. This metamorphosis is complete when the larva develops the features of a juvenile fish.		Salmon egg hatching. The larva has broken through and is discarding the egg envelope. In about 24hrs it will absorb the remaining yolk sac and become a juvenile.

== Skin ionocytes ==
Three-day-old larval white seabass with Na+/K+-ATPase immunostained in brown to identify its ionocytes

Ionocytes (formerly known as mitochondrion-rich cells or as chloride cells) are responsible for maintaining optimal osmotic, ionic, and acid-base levels within the fish. Ionocytes are typically found within adult gills. However, embryonic and larval fishes often lack or have underdeveloped gills. Instead, ionocytes are found along the skin, yolk sac, and fins of the larva. As growth progresses and the gill becomes more developed, ionocytes can be found on the gill arch and gill filament. In larval fishes, the number, size, and density of ionocytes can be quantified as a relative ionocyte area, which has been proposed as a proxy for osmotic, ionic, and/or acid-base capacity of the organism. Ionocytes are also known to be plastic. Ionocyte's apical openings can widen during periods of high activity, and new ionocytes can develop along the gill lamellae during periods of environmental stress. Due to the abundant presence of Na^{+}/K^{+}-ATPase in the basolateral membrane, ionocytes can often be located using immunohistochemistry.

== Survival ==
Recruitment of fish is regulated by larval fish survival. Survival is regulated by prey abundance, predation, and hydrology. Fish eggs and larvae are eaten by many marine organisms. For example, they may be fed upon by marine invertebrates, such as copepods, arrow worms, jellyfish, amphipods, marine snails and krill. Because they are so abundant, marine invertebrates inflict high overall mortality rates. Adult fish also prey on fish eggs and larvae. For example, haddock were observed satiating themselves with herring eggs back in 1922. Another study found cod in a herring spawning area with 20,000 herring eggs in their stomachs, and concluded that they could prey on half of the total egg production. Fish also cannibalise their own eggs. For example, separate studies found northern anchovy (Engraulis mordax) were responsible for 28% of the mortality in their own egg population, while Peruvian anchoveta were responsible for 10% and South African anchovy (Engraulis encrasicolus) 70%.

The most effective predators are about ten times as long as the larvae they prey on. This is true regardless of whether the predator is a crustacean, a jellyfish, or a fish.

== Dispersal ==
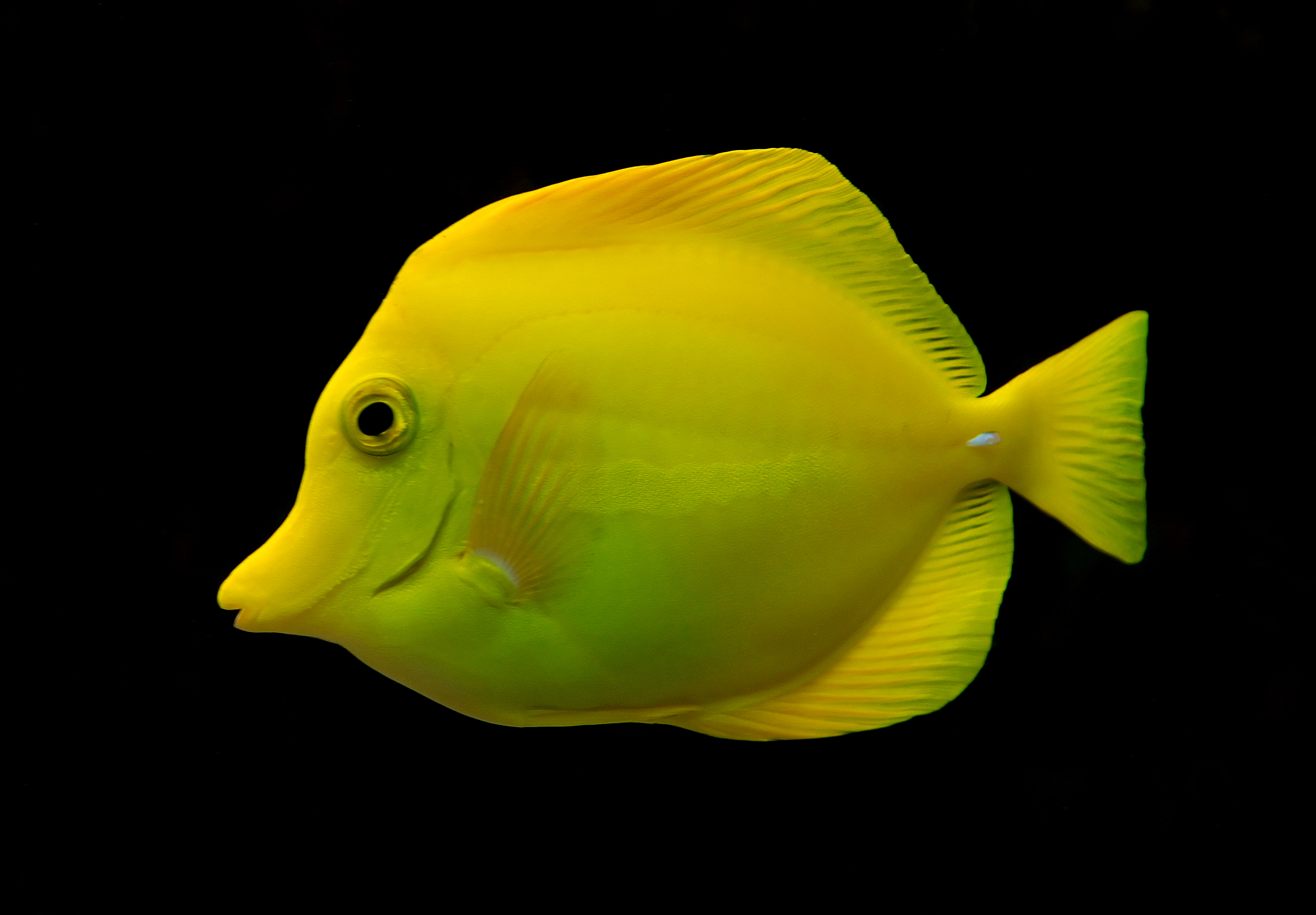
The larvae of the yellow tang can drift more than 100 miles and reseed in a distant location.

Fish larvae develop first an ability to swim up and down the water column for short distances. Later they develop an ability to swim horizontally for much longer distances. These swimming developments affect their dispersal.

In 2010, a group of scientists reported that fish larvae can drift on ocean currents and reseed fish stocks at a distant location. This finding demonstrates, for the first time, what scientists have long suspected but have never proven, that fish populations can be connected to distant populations through the process of larval drift.

The fish they chose to investigate was the yellow tang, because when a larva of this fish find a suitable reef it stays in the general area for the rest of its life. Thus, it is only as drifting larvae that the fish can migrate significant distances from where they are born. The tropical yellow tang is much sought after by the aquarium trade. By the late 1990s, their stocks were collapsing, so in an attempt to save them nine marine protected areas (MPAs) were established off the coast of Hawaii. Now, through the process of larval drift, fish from the MPAs are establishing themselves in different locations, and the fishery is recovering. "We've clearly shown that fish larvae that were spawned inside marine reserves can drift with currents and replenish fished areas long distances away," said one of the authors, the marine biologist Mark Hixon. "This is a direct observation, not just a model, that successful marine reserves can sustain fisheries beyond their borders."

== Gallery ==
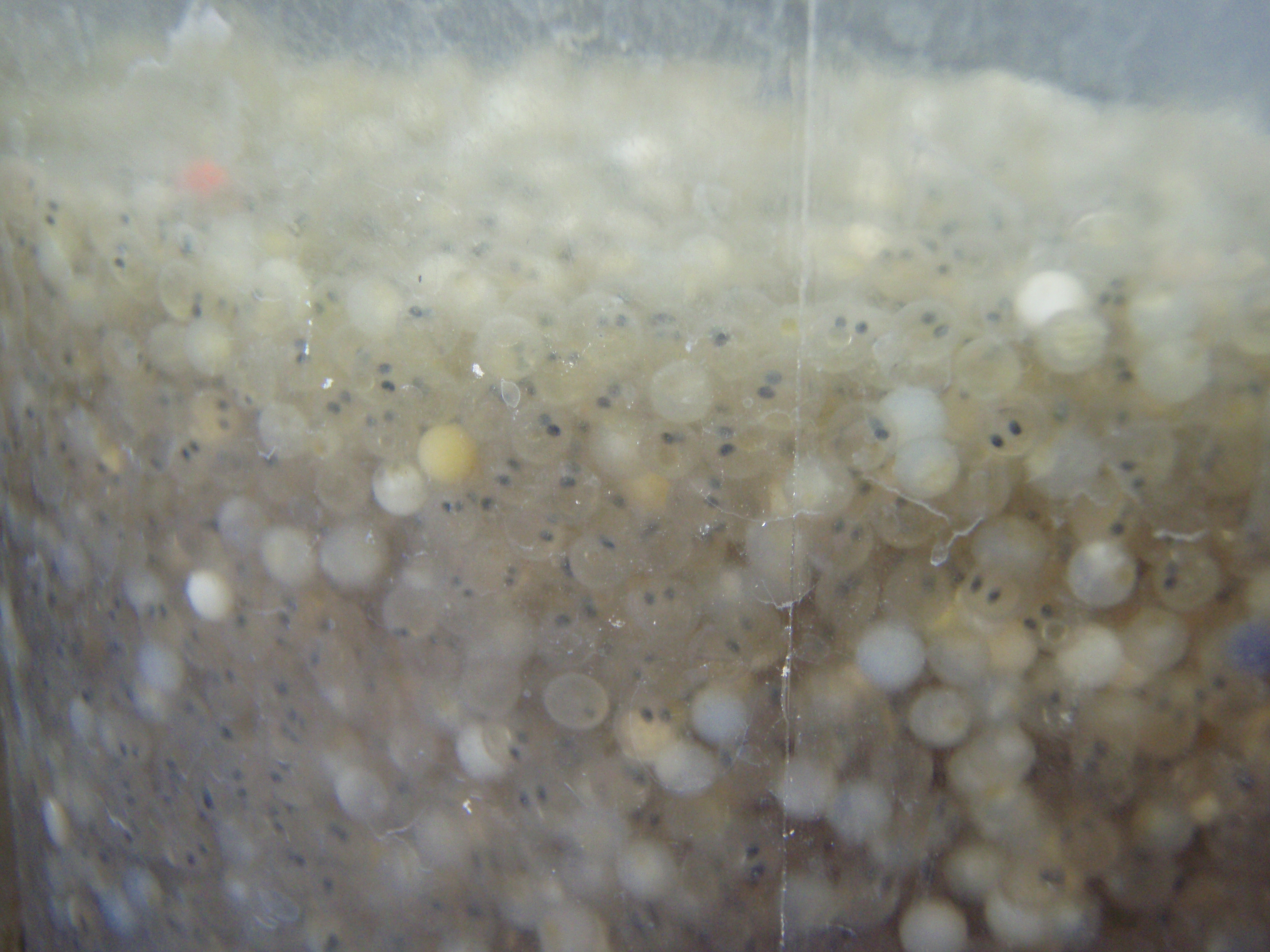
Coregonus maraena eggs about one month after fertilization

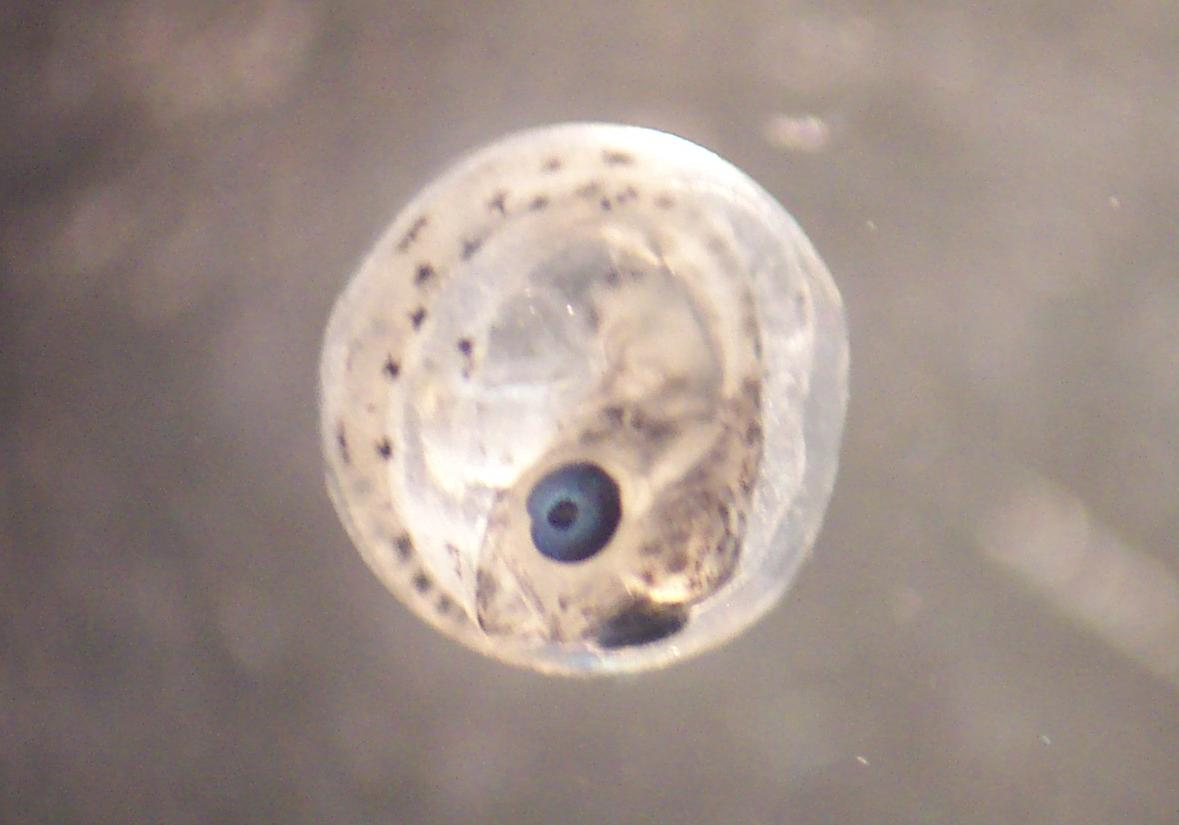
Ragfish egg

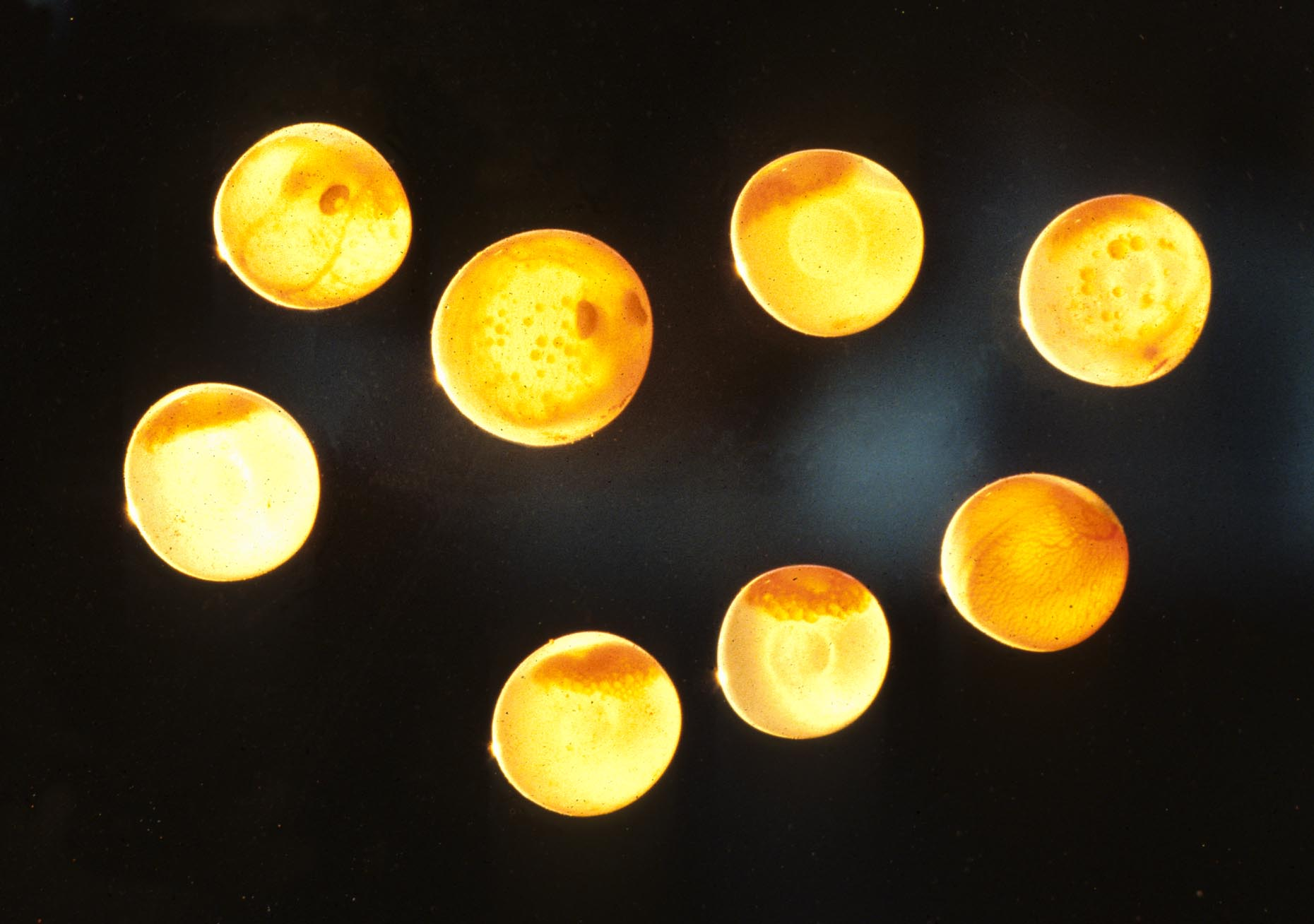
Salmon eggs in different stages of development.

Male goldfish encourage a spawning female and discharge sperm to externally fertilize her eggs

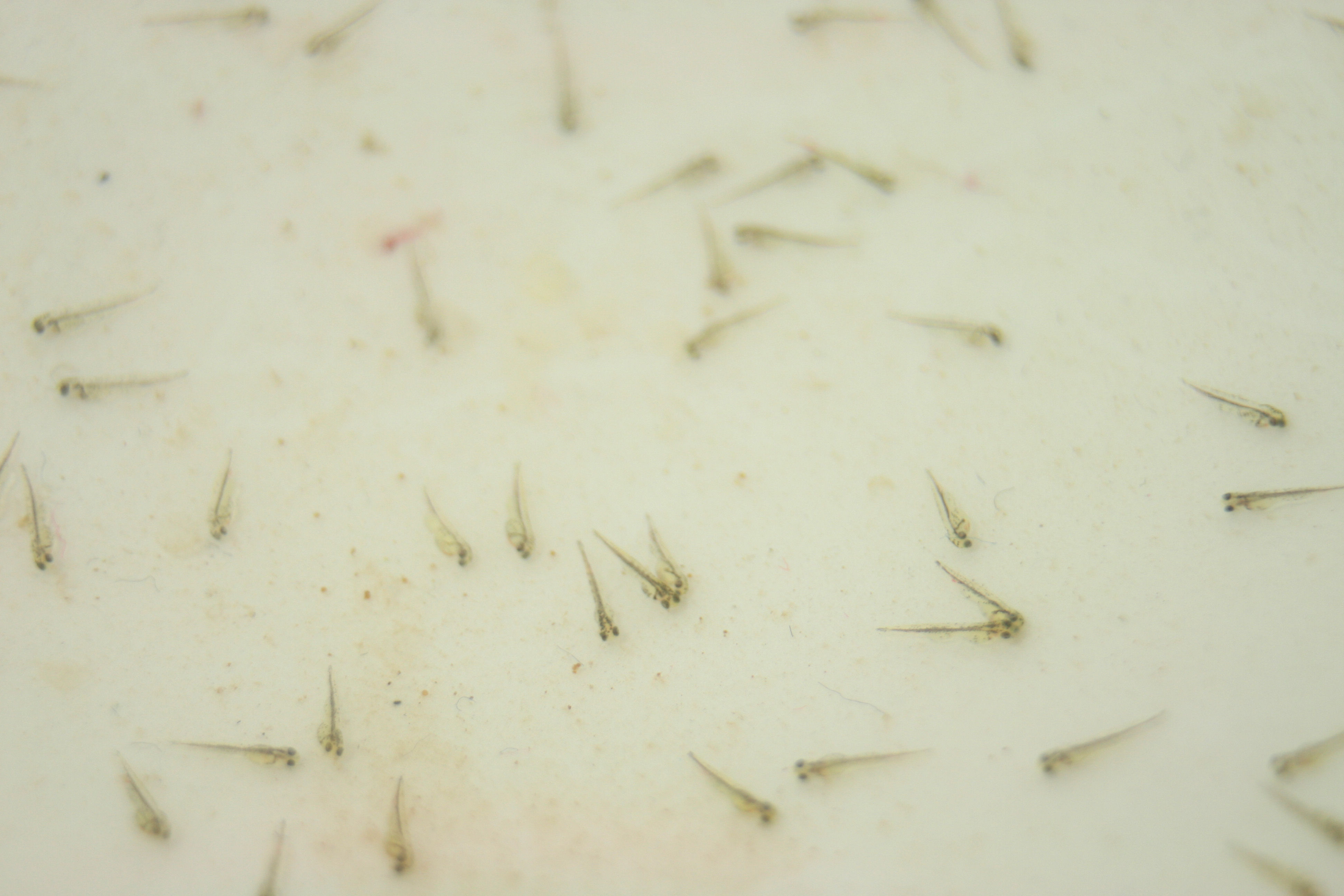
Within days, the vulnerable goldfish eggs hatch into larvae, and rapidly develop into fry
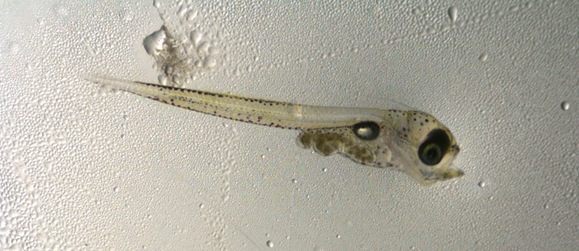
Pacific cod larva

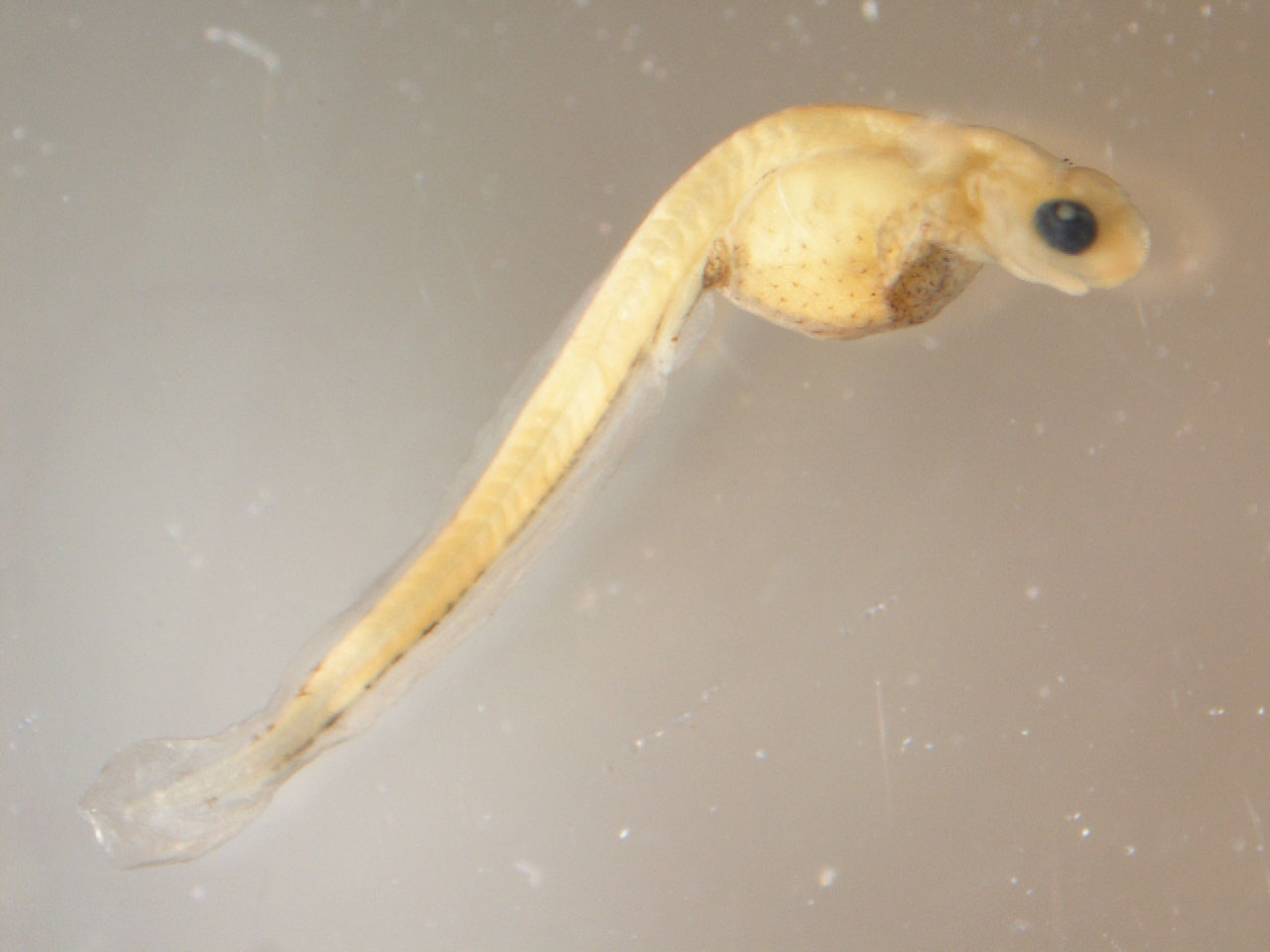
Walleye larva

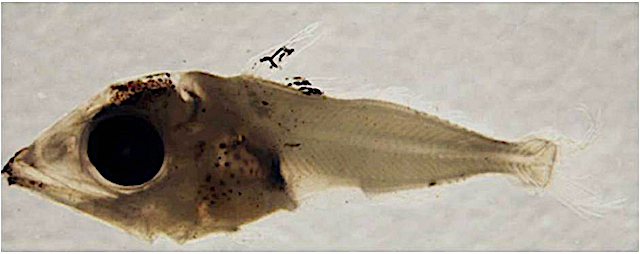
Bluefin tuna larva

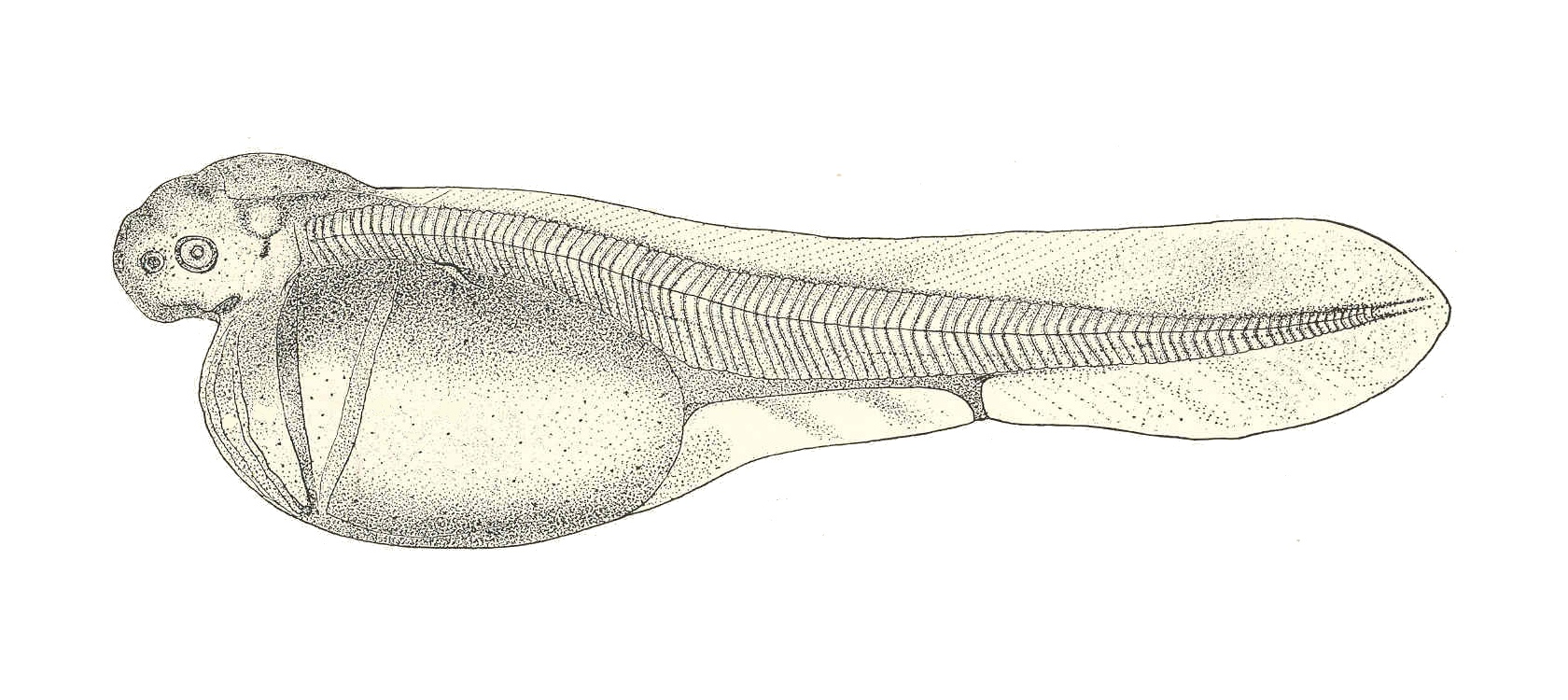
Common sturgeon larva
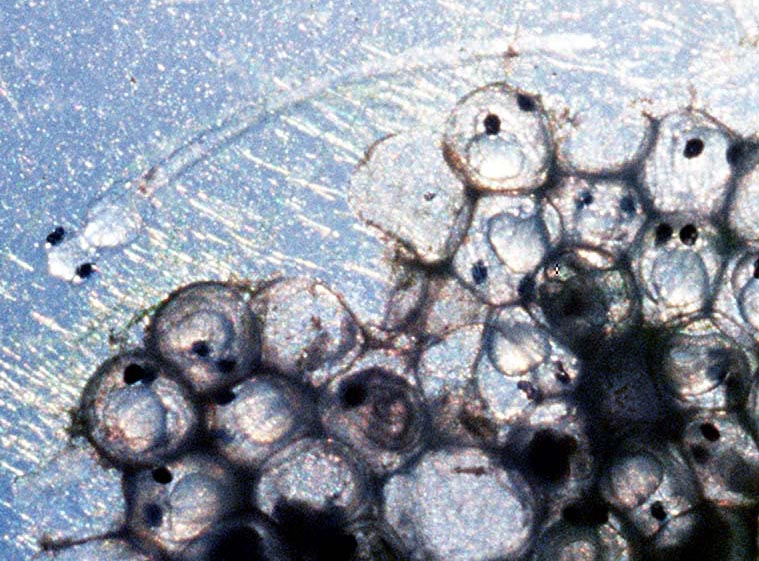
Atlantic herring eggs, with a newly hatched larva

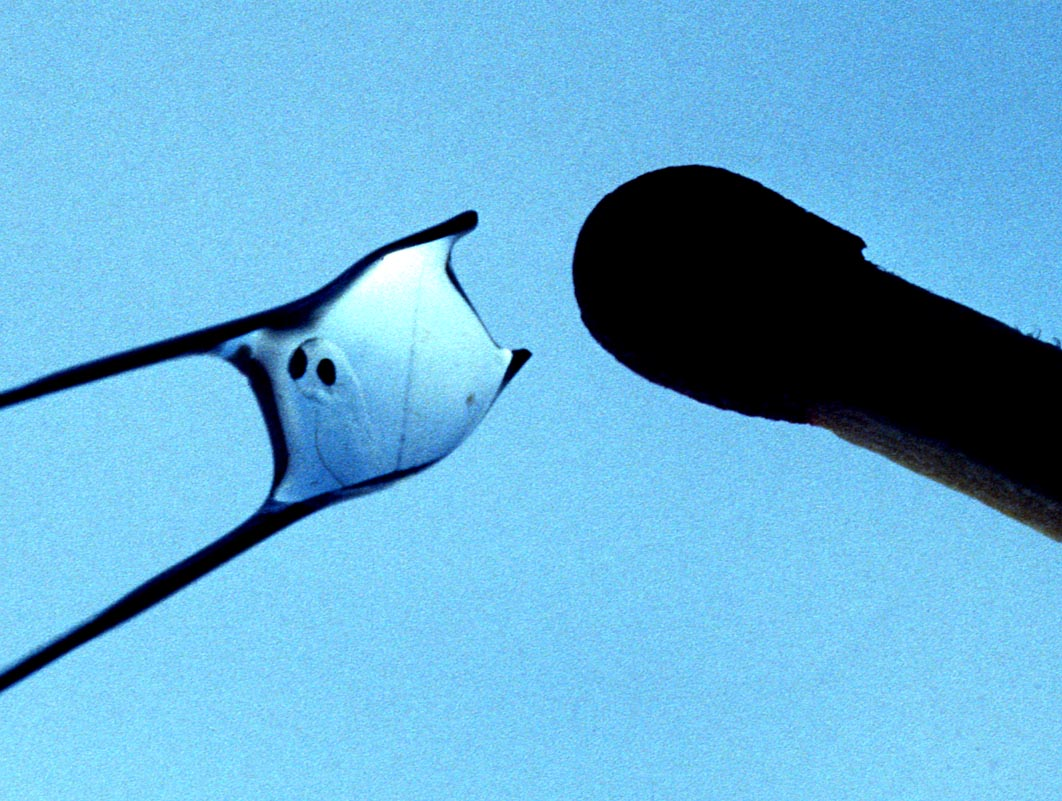
Freshly hatched herring larva in a drop of water compared to a match head.

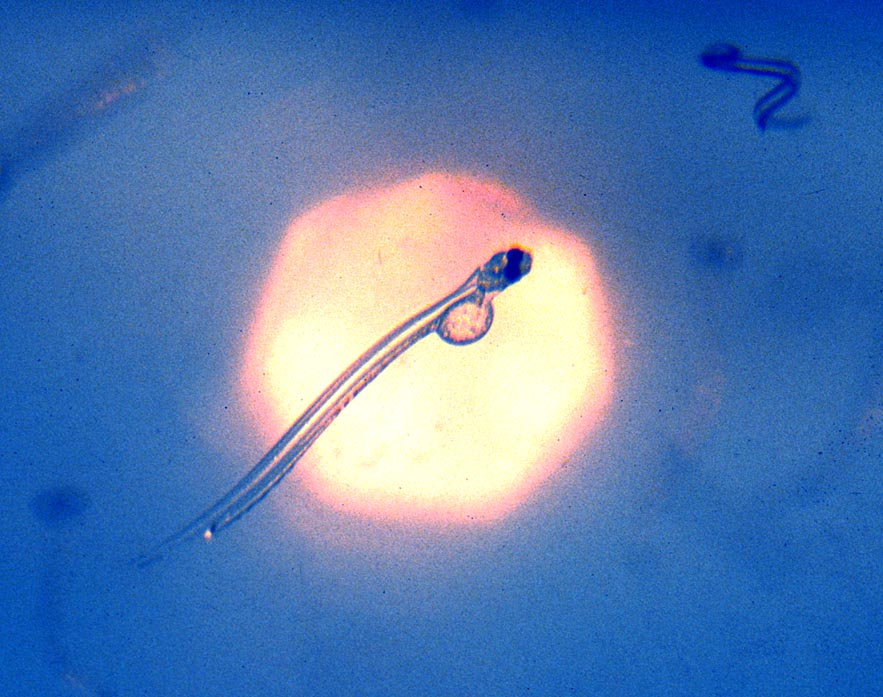
Early stage herring larvae imaged in situ with yolk remains

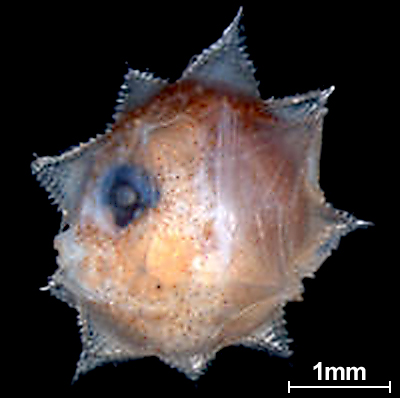
A 2.7mm long larva of the ocean sunfish, Mola mola,

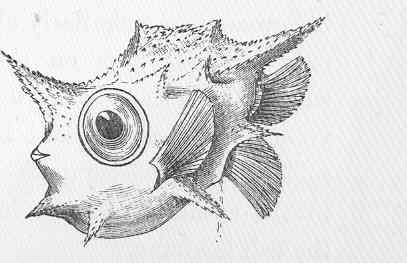
Boxfish larva

== See also ==
- CalCOFI
- Continuous Plankton Recorder
- Crustacean larvae
- Egg case
- Embryo
- LarvalBase – an online database for ichthyoplankton
- Marine larval ecology
- Milt
- Salmon run
- Spawning bed
- Spawning trigger
- Stable ocean hypothesis
- Video plankton recorder
