= Video plankton recorder =

A video plankton recorder (VPR) is towed underwater video microscope system, which photographs small to fine-scale structure of plankton, from 50 micrometers and up to a few centimeters in size. A VPR consists of five general components: cameras (with magnifying optics), strobe, additive sensor and flight control, underwater platform and interface software for plankton identification.

== Technical aspects ==
In order to obtain high-quality and low-noise images, charge-coupled device (CCD) sensors are used in the camera system. In the early design system, the CCD cameras were mounted in one of the arm of the platform. The developments in the recent years made the cameras system possible to be mounted in the platform body along with other sensors and flight control. The magnification power on the cameras should be vary, with high magnification power on the camera, we can obtain detail observation result on the plankton sample, such as protozoan that has <1 μm resolution . In other hand, the high magnification is able to identify plankton into genus level while low magnification of the camera will provide the rare and larger taxa.

The xenon strobe (red-filtered 80 W) provides the VPR systems with the Lighting to support the work of the video camera. It is placed in the other side of the platform arm. This design is intended to provide the area between camera and strobe as undisturbed water volume for continuous observation in the VPR system.

As a complex system, VPR can also carry several oceanographic sensors in the same time such as, CTD, transmissometer, fluorometer and flowmeter. These sensors enable the system to measure temperature, conductivity, depth, flow measurement, fraction of light in the water and the fluorescence.

The housing or platforms for this instrument is varying depend on the purpose of the survey. These are the particular platform that has been tested and used to mount the VPR:

1. Towed device
2. Remotely operated underwater vehicle(ROV)
3. Autonomous underwater vehicle (AUV)
4. Autonomous profiling mooring

The improvements of imaging system to observe, calculate and measure plankton in the ocean enable the detail observation on the specific plankton community. This early development was conducted by enumerating and counting the silhouette photography of plankton, the result then is processed with software package such as Matlab.

=== Imaging software ===
The most important part in VPR is the plankton identification software. Any developments of the software should improve the required task performed by VPR. In a nutshell, the software should have the ability of:

1. Importing the plankton images database in to the system.
2. Validate the object and evaluate from the background of the sample. This qualification should include the capability of the software to discriminate unknown object from plankton.
3. Identify and classify the samples therefore plankton can be distinguished from each other.
4. Presenting the result in the form of; abundance, size of distribution and biomass.

== Observation result ==
The study conducted by Benfield, M.C., et al. has discovered that VPR provided comparable data on the taxonomic composition of the plankton compared to physical plankton survey taken by MOCNESS.

The figure in the right side shows us the general trends in abundance and detail scale patchiness along the observation area.

== Advantage and Disadvantages ==
Although a VPR has a drawback for not being able to identify plankton into species level, the advantages to use this instrument has gone beyond its limitation to provide us with convenient and accurate result. The high resolution result on plankton taxa observation along with synchronized measurement environmental variables from another oceanographic sensor attached in VPR body can be considered as the milestone of this device. In addition, since the observation is conducted visually by photographing the sample, the observation of delicate plankton and gelatinous species can be done accurately without having them destroyed in the net.

== Gallery ==
Source of Picture Gallery
