= MOCNESS =

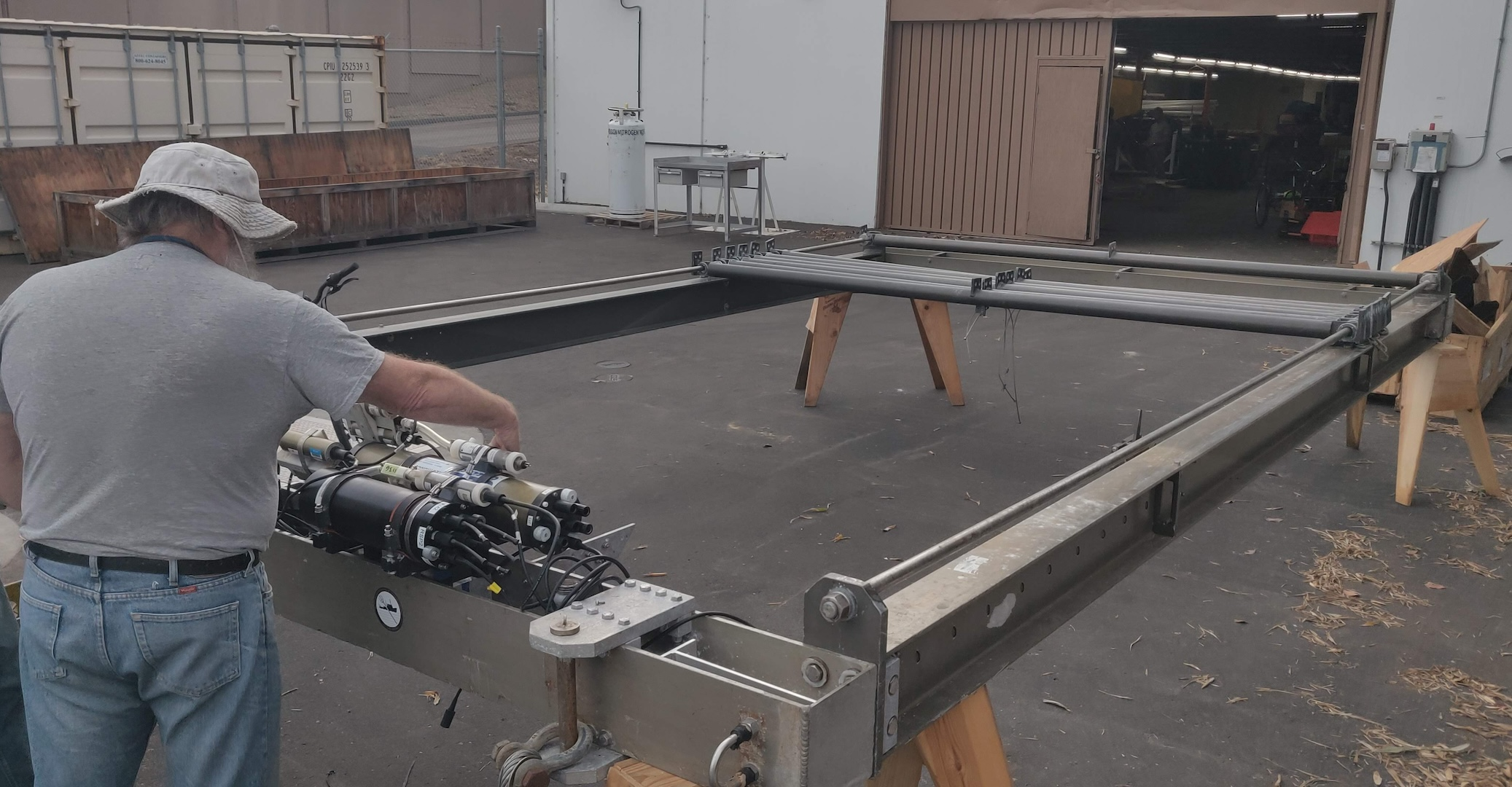
A MOCNESS system with the nets taken off

The MOCNESS (acronym for Multiple Opening/Closing Net and Environmental Sensing System) is a towed net system for plankton and particles in the ocean. Consisting of 5-20 nets of variable mesh sizes, it is useful for collecting samples at multiple depths and sizes.

== Design and usage ==
The system is towed behind a research vessel with a speed of up to 2.5 knots (1.3 m/s) and consists of five to twenty nets with a mesh size from 64 μm to 3 mm and an area of 0.25 to 20 m^{2} (although the last one is a 2x10 m systems) which are opened and closed computer controlled at desired depth. The net enables biologists to catch zooplankton and nekton in various depth horizons typically anywhere in the upper 6000 m of the oceans. All MOCNESS systems are capable of sampling to 6000 meters depth (10,000 psi). The system includes SeaBird probes to measure salinity and temperature at sampling depths, as well as optional dissolved oxygen, PAR (photosynthetically available light), transmissomety and fluorescence sensors.

== Example cruises and discoveries ==
In 2008, a MOCNESS system was used on the PFS Polarstern to collect zooplankton samples from 4,000 metres (13,000 ft) deep, with CTD physiochemical measurements transmitted to the on-board laboratory to confirm net depth and water properties.

A MOCNESS was used to investigate sinking plastic particles at the Great Pacific Garbage Patch in 2018. By closing nets of variable mesh sizes at different depths, microplastic debris was found negatively buoyant at depth and therefore sinking from the surface.
